= JT LeRoy (film) =

- Theatrical release poster
- Directed by: Justin Kelly
- Written by: Justin Kelly; Savannah Knoop
- Based on: Girl Boy Girl: How I Became JT Leroy by Savannah Knoop
- Produced by: Cassian Elwes; Gary Pearl; Dave Hansen; Mark Amin; Julie Yorn; Patrick Walmsley; Thor Bradwell; Giri Tharan
- Starring: Kristen Stewart; Laura Dern; Kelvin Harrison Jr.; Courtney Love; James Jagger; Dave Brown; Jim Sturgess; Diane Kruger; Eric Plamondon
- Cinematography: Bobby Bukowski
- Edited by: Aaron I. Butler
- Music by: Tim Kvasnosky
- Production companies: Buffalo Gal Pictures; Sobini Films; LBI Entertainment; Thirty Three Management
- Distributed by: Universal Pictures (United States); Signature Entertainment (United Kingdom)
- Release dates: September 15, 2018 (TIFF); April 26, 2019 (United States)
- Running time: 108 minutes
- Countries: Canada; United States; United Kingdom
- Language: English
- Budget: $2 million

JT LeRoy is a 2018 biographical drama film directed by Justin Kelly based on the memoir Girl Boy Girl: How I Became JT Leroy by Savannah Knoop. It stars Kristen Stewart, Laura Dern, Kelvin Harrison Jr., Diane Kruger, James Jagger, Dave Brown, Jim Sturgess and Courtney Love.

It had its world premiere as the closing night film of the 2018 Toronto International Film Festival. It was released April 26, 2019, by Universal Pictures.

== Premise ==
Savannah Knoop spends six years masquerading as writer Laura Albert's literary persona JT LeRoy, the author credited for the novels Sarah and The Heart Is Deceitful Above All Things.

== Cast ==
- Laura Dern as Laura Albert
- Kristen Stewart as Savannah Knoop
- Diane Kruger as Eva
- Jim Sturgess as Geoffrey Knoop
- Kelvin Harrison Jr. as Sean
- Courtney Love as Sasha
- James Jagger as Ben
- Dave Brown as Bruce

== Production ==
On February 9, 2016, it was reported that Kristen Stewart, James Franco, and Helena Bonham Carter were circling the film JT LeRoy. Justin Kelly would direct the film based on Savannah Knoop's memoir Girl Boy Girl: How I Became JT Leroy. On March 22, 2017, it was reported that Laura Dern was in talks to join the film. Dern would play Laura Albert alongside Stewart as Knoop. On May 16, 2017, Diane Kruger joined the cast. On May 23, 2017, Jim Sturgess joined the cast. Before the film was fully financed, a skeleton crew attended the 2017 Cannes Film Festival to obtain some necessary footage. As of August 1, 2017, the film had begun principal photography in Winnipeg, Manitoba, Canada. Kelvin Harrison Jr., Courtney Love, and James Jagger also joined the cast. As of August 18, 2017, JT LeRoy had wrapped filming.

== Release ==
It had its world premiere at the Toronto International Film Festival on September 15, 2018. Shortly after, Universal Pictures acquired distribution rights to the film. It was released on April 26, 2019.

== Critical response ==
The review aggregator website Rotten Tomatoes reported a 55% approval rating with an average score of 6.1/10, based on 87 reviews. The website's critical consensus reads, "While it may leave some viewers wishing for a more in-depth exploration of its story and themes, J.T. Leroy offers a diverting dramatization of incredible real-life events." On Metacritic, the film has a weighted average score of 55 out of 100, based on 23 critics, indicating "mixed or average" reviews.
