= The Heart Is Deceitful Above All Things =

2004 film by Asia Argento

- Theatrical release poster
- Directed by: Asia Argento
- Screenplay by: Asia Argento; Alessandro Magania
- Based on: The Heart Is Deceitful Above All Things by JT Leroy
- Produced by: Chris Hanley; Ryan R. Johnson
- Starring: Asia Argento; Jimmy Bennett; Dylan Sprouse; Cole Sprouse; Marilyn Manson; Peter Fonda
- Cinematography: Eric Alan Edwards
- Edited by: Jim Mol
- Music by: Marco Castoldi; Billy Corgan; Kim Gordon
- Distributed by: Palm Pictures (United States); Palisades Tartan (United Kingdom); Wild Bunch (France); Artist Films Co. Ltd. (Japan)
- Release dates: May 15, 2004 (Cannes); January 19, 2005 (France); May 7, 2005 (Japan); July 15, 2005 (United Kingdom); March 10, 2006 (United States)
- Running time: 98 minutes
- Countries: United States; United Kingdom; France; Japan
- Language: English
- Box office: $211,355

The Heart Is Deceitful Above All Things is a 2004 independent Southern Gothic drama film co-written and directed by Asia Argento and starring Argento, Jimmy Bennett, Dylan Sprouse and Cole Sprouse (with Bennett and the Sprouse brothers sharing the role as Jeremiah). The screenplay by Argento and Alessandro Magania is based on JT LeRoy's novel of the same name. The film received a limited release in North America on March 10, 2006, shortly after Laura Albert was revealed to be the actual author of the JT LeRoy books.

The film concerns a tattered relationship between Sarah, a drug addict, and her young son, Jeremiah. Their life together is marked by Sarah's substance abuse. The title is taken from Jeremiah 17:9.

== Plot ==
Sarah (Asia Argento) is the young mother of Jeremiah who has him move back in with her after spending his early years with a stable foster family. Their life soon becomes hectic with Sarah not only giving her young son drugs, but also giving him a chaotic life on the road.

Sarah becomes involved with a series of men who treat her and seven-year-old Jeremiah (Jimmy Bennett) poorly, and she uses them as an excuse to abandon her son. She disappears to Atlantic City with her boyfriend, Emerson (Jeremy Renner), and then deserts him; Emerson returns to their home and rapes Jeremiah. After a trip to the hospital, Jeremiah's grandmother (Ornella Muti) takes him to a West Virginian radical Christian cult led by his grandfather (Peter Fonda). After he has been with the cult for three years, Sarah returns to reclaim the 11-year-old Jeremiah (Dylan and Cole Sprouse).

Sarah's current lover, Kenny (Matt Schulze), a truck driver, eventually abandons them at a truck stop while Sarah is soliciting. Sarah realizes that if she is going to keep her men, she cannot say Jeremiah is her son. She persuades Jeremiah to cross-dress so that he can act as her "little sister"; and Jeremiah's cross-dressing evolves to include his mother's seduction techniques. After dressing up as a "baby doll" version of Sarah which consisted of her makeup, her white nightgown and her red high heel pumps, Jeremiah seduces Jackson (Marilyn Manson), his mother's latest man, who initially tries to rebuff the boy's advances, but then gives in. Sarah is furious with Jackson for giving in to the boy's advances and also with Jeremiah for ruining her panties with drops of blood on them. She then takes Jeremiah and leaves.

Later, they are in a house where the basement houses a methamphetamine laboratory, which later blows up with Sarah's latest boyfriend inside. After fleeing, and while detoxing from methamphetamine, Sarah is convinced that everyone is after them and that only certain foods are edible (mainly chips and sugary soda). She convinces Jeremiah that if they eat anything but these foods, they will be poisoned which leads them to a failed attempt to shoplift at a grocery store; afterwards, Jeremiah finds and eats a hamburger from a dumpster. His mother, in a state of "meth psychosis", is convinced the food he ate was poison, and makes him drink ipecac in order to make him better and rid him of any "poisons".

Jeremiah wakes up in the hospital with his grandmother beside him. She tells him that Sarah is in the psychiatric ward. Later that night, Sarah collects Jeremiah from his hospital room, and rather than have him go back to the cult, she clutches his hand, and they walk off into the world in their hospital gowns. The final scene is of Sarah and Jeremiah driving away.

== Cast ==
- Asia Argento as Sarah
- Jimmy Bennett as Young Jeremiah
  - Dylan and Cole Sprouse as Older Jeremiah
- Marilyn Manson as Jackson
- Peter Fonda as Grandfather
- Ornella Muti as Grandmother
- Kip Pardue as Luther
- Jeremy Renner as Emerson
- John Robinson as Aaron
- Ben Foster as Fleshy Boy
- Michael Pitt as Buddy
- Jeremy Sisto as Chester
- Matt Schulze as Kenny
- Winona Ryder as Psychologist (uncredited)
- Tim Armstrong as Stinky (uncredited; Armstrong also contributed to the soundtrack)
- Vera Aldridge as Girl in Grocery Store

== Soundtrack ==
Although the soundtrack to the film was never commercially released, here is a list of different songs featured in the film, along with the scenes they are played in.

- "Born to Be Dizzy" – The Starlite Desperation (Sarah and Jeremiah drive away from the hospital)
- "Karen Koltrane (instrumental version)" – Sonic Youth (Jeremiah draws on the walls)
- "Beautiful Plateau" – Sonic Youth (Sarah and Jeremiah drive away from exploding meth lab)
- "Linda Lovelace" – David Allan Coe (Kenny leaves Jeremiah alone in truck after "cleaning up")
- "She Said" – Hasil Adkins (Sarah gets Jeremiah and meets Kenny)
- "Muskrat" – Pagoda (At the end, when Jeremiah leaves the diner)
- "Mickey Mouse Is Dead (live)" – The Subhumans (Before Kenny changes the tape)
- "Two Time Girl" – Knoxville Girls (after Kenny pulls over to get Sarah's tape)
- "There He Goes" (Asia Argento cover) – Loretta Lynn (At strip club with Sarah)

== Reception ==
The Heart Is Deceitful Above All Things received mixed to negative reviews from critics. Review aggregator website Rotten Tomatoes reports a 40% rating based on 50 reviews. The site's consensus states: "The film aims to shock, but there is no higher reason for the parade of sordid images except to be 'cool'." On Metacritic, the film has a 27 out of 100 rating based on 22 critics, indicating "generally unfavorable reviews".

Bennett portraying the son of her character in this film was referenced in the later 2018 allegations that Argento sexually assaulted him when he was 17 years old.
