= Warren St. John =

American author and journalist

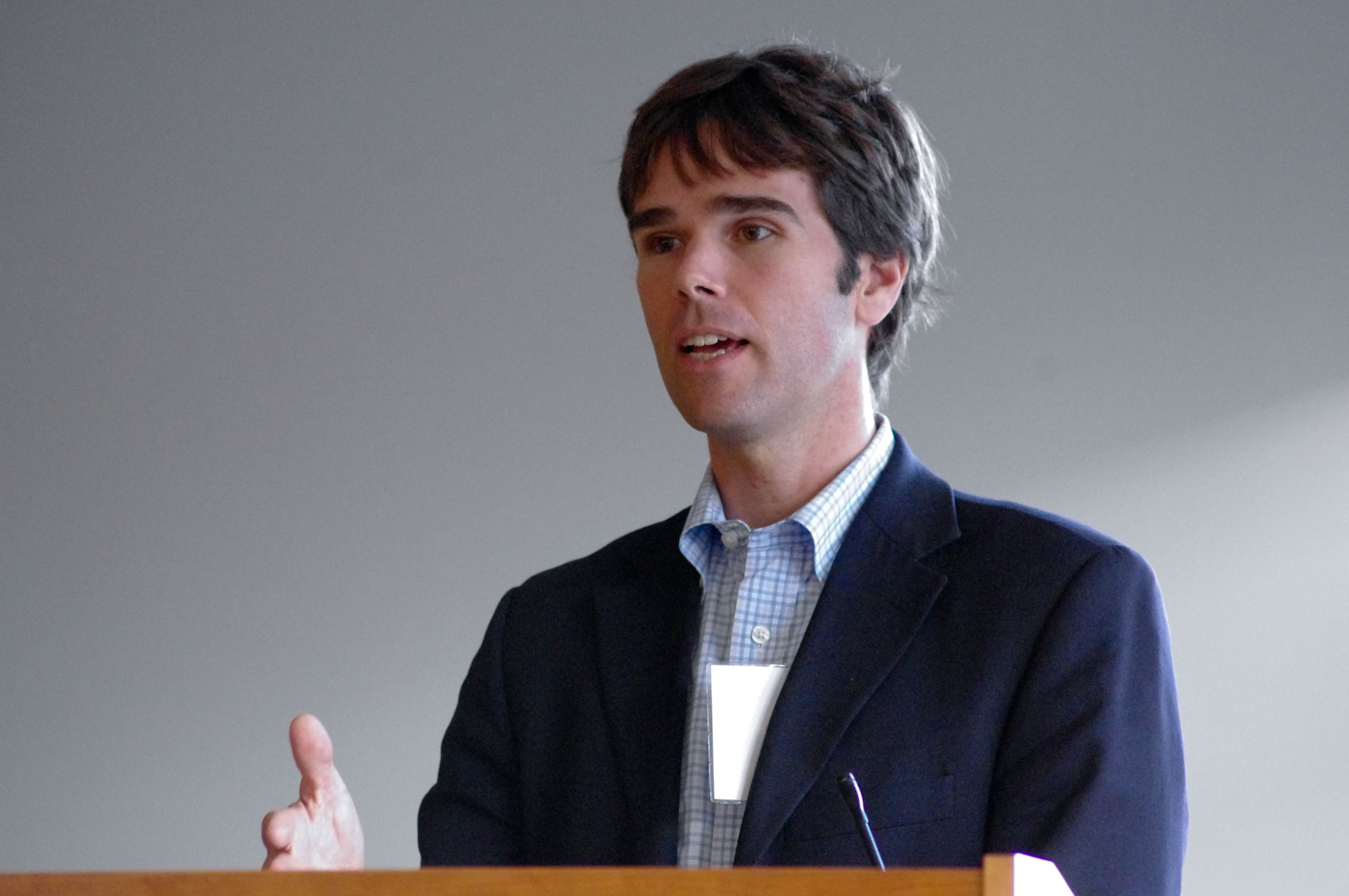
Warren St. John in 2010

Warren St. John is an American author, journalist and business executive. He was a reporter at The New York Times from 2002 to 2008 and is now the Chief Executive Officer of Patch, the hyperlocal news network that was formerly part of AOL.

St. John is the author of the National Bestseller Rammer Jammer Yellow Hammer: A Road Trip into the Heart of Fan Mania. The book explores the phenomenon of sports fandom and chronicles the Alabama Crimson Tide's 1999 season by following the team in a recreational vehicle, telling the stories of extremely devoted fans he met during the season. Rammer Jammer Yellow Hammer was named one of Sports Illustrated's best books of the year in 2004, and it ranked number one on The Chronicle of Higher Education's list of the best books ever written about collegiate athletics. "Rammer Jammer Yellow Hammer" was optioned for film in 2009 by the Los Angeles–based production company Half Shell Entertainment.

St. John's second book, Outcasts United: An American Town, A Refugee Team and One Woman's Quest to Make a Difference, was published in the U.S. on April 21, 2009, by Spiegel & Grau, a division of Random House, and subsequently in the U.K., The Netherlands, Germany, Italy, Japan and China. The book tells the story of Clarkston, Georgia, a southern town that became a center for refugee resettlement, through the lens of a soccer team of refugee boys called "the Fugees." The book explores the difficulties the team and town face as people from a range of ethnic and cultural backgrounds are forced to live and work together. The book and St. John's 2007 article for The New York Times about the team, "The Fugees: Adjusting to America; Outcasts United," were optioned for a motion picture by Universal Studios.

At The Times, St. John was principally a feature writer. In 2005, he introduced the term "metrosexual" into widespread usage through a Times piece headlined "Metrosexuals Come Out." In 2006, St. John played a major role in the JT LeRoy hoax, publicly identifying both the actress who portrayed the author during public appearances (Savannah Knoop) and the actual writer of LeRoy's works (Laura Albert). St. John frequently writes about the impact of technology on social behavior, and has written for The New Yorker, Slate, the New York Observer, and Wired.

St. John was born in Birmingham, Alabama, and attended The Altamont School. He graduated from Columbia University in 1991.
