= Literary forgery =

Literary work which is deliberately misattributed to a historical or invented author

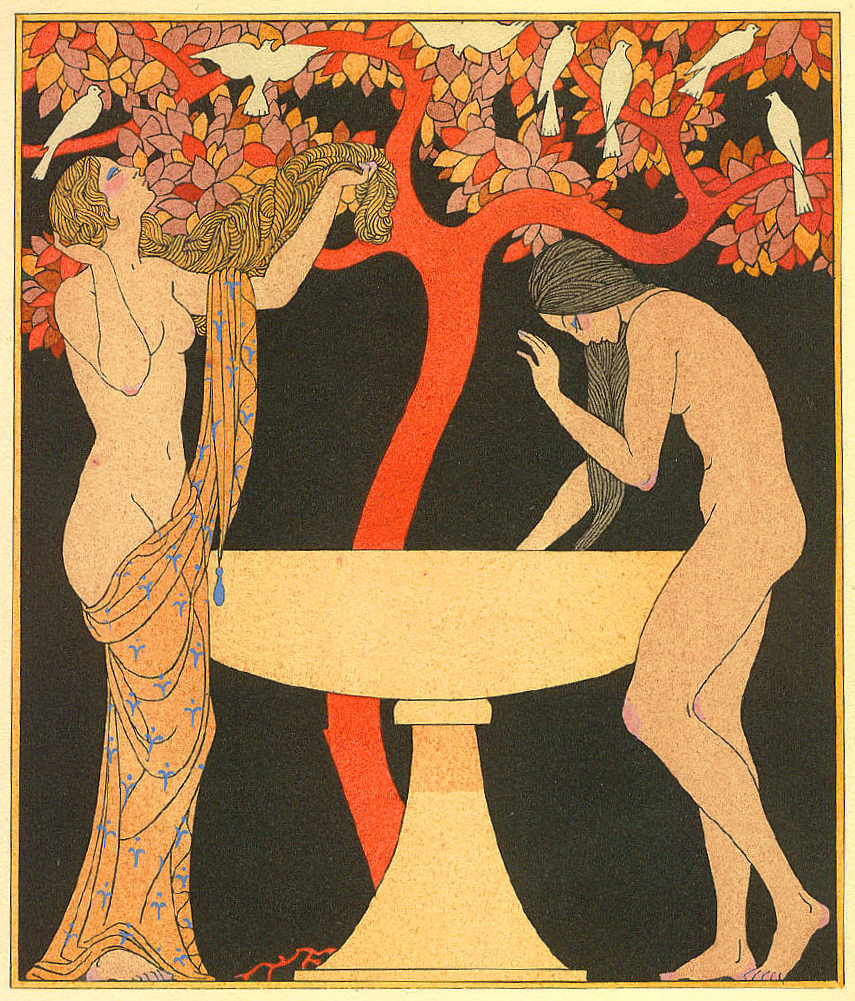
Cover of The Songs of Bilitis (1894), a French pseudotranslation of Ancient Greek erotic poetry by Pierre Louÿs

Literary forgery (also known as literary mystification, literary fraud or literary hoax) is writing, such as a manuscript or a literary work, which is either deliberately misattributed to a historical or invented author, or is a purported memoir or other presumably nonfictional writing deceptively presented as true when, in fact, it presents untrue or imaginary information or content. These deceptive practices have a long history and have occurred across various literary traditions, often with significant cultural or financial impacts.

Literary forgeries can take many forms, including works that are falsely claimed to be ancient texts by known authors, fabricated memoirs, or fictional accounts presented as historical records. The reasons for creating literary forgeries can vary, including the pursuit of financial gain, the desire for literary recognition, or the promotion of specific ideological views.

While literary forgeries are often exposed and discredited, they can nevertheless have outsized impacts in shaping cultural and historical narratives.

== History ==
Literary forgery may involve the work of a famous author whose writings have an established intrinsic, as well as monetary value. In an attempt to gain the rewards of such a reputation, the forger often engages in two distinct activities. The forger produces a writing which resembles the style of the known reputable author to whom the fake is to be attributed. The forger may also fake the physical alleged original manuscript. This is less common, as it requires a great deal of technical effort, such as imitating the ink and paper. The forger may also claim that, not only is the style of writing the same, but also that the ink and paper are of the kind or type used by the famous author. Other common types of literary forgery may draw upon the potential historical cachet and novelty of a previously undiscovered author.

Literary forgery has a long history. Onomacritus (c. 530 – 480 BCE) is among the most ancient known literary forgers. He created prophecies, which he ascribed to the poet Musaeus. In the 4th century BCE, Axiopistus created forgeries he attributed to 5th-century BCE writer Epicharmus of Kos.

In the 3rd century CE, a certain Septimius produced what appeared to be a Latin translation of an eyewitness account of the Trojan War by Dictys of Crete. In the letter of dedication, the translator gave additional credence to the document by claiming the Greek original had come to light during Nero's reign when Dictys' tomb was opened by an earthquake and his diary was discovered. Septimius then claimed the original had been handed to the governor of Crete, Rutilius Rufus, who gave the diary to Nero during his tour of Greece in 66-67 CE. According to historian Miriam Griffin, such bogus and romantic claims to antiquity were not uncommon at the time.

One of the longest lasting literary forgeries is by Pseudo-Dionysius the Areopagite, a 5th-6th century Syrian mystical writer who claimed to be a disciple of Paul the Apostle. Five hundred years later, Abelard expressed doubts about the authorship, but it was not until after the Renaissance that there was general agreement that the attribution of the work was false. In the intervening 1,000 years, the writings had much theological influence.

Thomas Chatterton (1752–1770), the English poet and letter writer, began his medieval forgeries when little more than a child. While they brought him praise and fame after his death, his writing afforded little in the way of financial success and he died, possibly by suicide, aged 17, penniless, alone and half-starved.

The English Mercurie appeared to be the first English newspaper when it was discovered in 1794. This was, ostensibly, an account of the English battle with the Spanish Armada of 1588, but was, in fact, written in the 18th century by Philip Yorke, 2nd Earl of Hardwicke, as a literary game with his friends.

Thomas James Wise (1859-1937) was long regarded as one of the most respected private book collectors in Britain, and his Ashley Library attracted scholars from Europe and the United States. Known for exposing literary fraud and denying involvement in book dealing, Wise enjoyed a strong reputation until 1934. That year, John W. Carter and Henry Graham Pollard demonstrated that dozens of valuable nineteenth-century pamphlets linked to Wise were forged. Later investigations uncovered further misconduct, including altering rare books with pages stolen from copies held by the British Museum.

Literary forgery was promoted as a creative method by Charles Nodier and, in the 19th century, many writers produced literary forgeries under his influence, notably Prosper Merimee and Pierre Louys.

== 20th century to present ==
The Protocols of the Elders of Zion is an antisemitic forged document first published in Russia in 1903–1904. The work purports to be details of a Jewish plan for world domination, and describes how Judaism will overthrow Christianity via control of the media, financial institutions, subverting the social order, and so on. The document was exposed as a forgery by English journalist Philip Graves in 1921. Graves showed the work drew as a source an 1864 political satire by Maurice Joly, The Dialogue in Hell Between Machiavelli and Montesquieu, except presenting it as real. Similar exposes were published in other languages, but it did not matter; the Protocols were immensely popular among anti-semitic circles, who took it as proof of the evilness of the Jews.

American authors Witter Bynner and Arthur Davison Ficke, both writing under pseudonyms, published Spectra: A Book of Poetic Experiments in 1916. They intended it as satire of Imagism. The book included a manifesto for an invented "Spectrist" school. The hoax was exposed in 1917.

Ernest Lalor "Ern" Malley was a fictitious poet invented by Australian writers James McAuley and Harold Stewart to lampoon a modernist art and literary movement centered around a journal called Angry Penguins. The authors created "Malley's" body of work in one day in 1943 and Angry Penguins devoted an issue to the poet. The Ern Malley hoax became the most famous hoax of Australian literary history.

I, Libertine began as a hoax perpetrated by radio host Jean Shepherd in coordination with his listeners, whom he instructed to contact local bookstores to ask for the "raunchy historical romance" by the fictitious author Frederick R. Ewing, said to be "a retired Royal Naval officer resident in Rhodesia and expert in eighteenth-century erotica." The ensuing scandal became so widely known that Ballantine Books commissioned Theodore Sturgeon to make it into a real book, which Ballantine published in 1956.

Newsday reporter Mike McGrady collaborated with other authors to produce a popular novel "so trashy and irredeemable that it could not be defended on any sort of critical grounds." McGrady deemed of its creation, "There will be an unremitting emphasis on sex. Also, true excellence in writing will be quickly blue-penciled into oblivion.” The result was Naked Came the Stranger by “Penelope Ashe." The book was published by Lyle Stuart in 1969. It sold 20,000 copies by the time McGrady revealed the hoax, at which point it quickly sold another 90,000 copies.

John Samuel Humble, known as “Wearside Jack,” carried out a hoax during the investigation of the Yorkshire Ripper murders. In 1978 he sent letters and an audio tape to police claiming to be the killer. Investigators treated the messages as genuine, diverting attention away from the real murderer, Peter Sutcliffe. Humble was obsessed with Jack the Ripper and plagiarized language and phrases from letters sent to police during the investigation of the Whitechapel murders in the 1880s. The deception contributed to major investigative errors and remained undiscovered for decades. Humble was identified through DNA evidence and convicted in 2006. He pleaded guilty to four counts of perverting justice, and at the trial Leeds Crown Court heard allegations that the delays caused by the hoax may have enabled Peter Sutcliffe to murder three additional women.

Konrad Kujau, an East German forger, created diaries purportedly written by Adolf Hitler. His forgeries, executed from 1981 to 1983, passed initial scrutiny. The magazine Stern purchased them at great expense, but various errors and closer forensic analysis revealed them as fakes. Kujau was subsequently sent to prison for fraud, theft and forgery.

Mark Hofmann was an American forger whose crimes combined literary deception with murder. During the 1970s and 1980s, he created highly convincing forged historical documents, many connected to early Mormon history. Among his most famous fabrications was the so-called “Salamander Letter,” which challenged accepted narratives of the church’s origins and deceived collectors, scholars, and religious institutions. As doubts about his documents grew and his financial schemes began to unravel, Hofmann planted bombs in 1985 to prevent exposure. The attacks killed two people and injured others, including Hofmann himself. He was later convicted and sentenced to life imprisonment.In 2021 Netflix released a true crime documentary series, Murder Among the Mormons, about Hoffman. One of the creators, Jared Hess commented the impact of Hofmann's forgeries:

We live in a world of misinformation. And a lot of the material that Hofmann was producing [evoked] a very visceral, emotional response—especially as it related to church documents, where you had a history that everybody believed to be true about the origins of the church. In this day and age, we have to be so careful about the narratives that we choose to believe and we have to dig a little deeper and not just accept them on an emotional level because it feels right. Otherwise we can really be led down a path that will end in tragedy.

Stewart Home explored the literary hoax as an anarchist art form in the 1980s and 1990s. One of his published fabrications resulted in the arrest of The KLF musician Jimmy Cauty on weapons charges. Home's literary pranks were collected in Confusion Incorporated: A Collection of Lies, Hoaxes & Hidden Truths (Codex, 1999).

Lee Israel was an American writer who became known for literary forgery in the early 1990s. Facing financial problems and a declining career after an unsuccessful biography of cosmetics mogul Estée Lauder, she forged letters attributed to famous authors and celebrities such as Dorothy Parker, Noël Coward and Louise Brooks, imitating their styles and inventing anecdotes to attract collectors. She later altered genuine letters as well. Her forgeries deceived collectors, entered archival collections, and circulated in the market as genuine historical documents. Her activities were eventually uncovered, resulting in criminal charges and later becoming the subject of her memoir Can You Ever Forgive Me?.

Laura Albert wrote novels in the late 1990s and early 2000s under the literary persona JT LeRoy. While literary personas are not necessarily hoaxes, LeRoy was promoted as having produced autobiographical fiction as a gay man. Because it was impossible for LeRoy to make public appearances, Albert invented another persona, Emily "Speedie" Frasier, who was supposedly LeRoy's roommate and would appear on his behalf. Albert's real identity was exposed by the magazine New York. Albert signed a contract with the name JT LeRoy with a film company for an adaptation of her novel Sarah. This resulted in a lawsuit that was decided against the author.

The Wanda Koolmatrie hoax caused a literary scandal in Australia. In 1994, the novel My Own Sweet Time was published as the autobiographical story of an Aboriginal woman named Wanda Koolmatrie, supposedly a member of the Stolen Generations. The book received praise and won literary awards. In 1997, however, “Wanda Koolmatrie” was revealed to be a fabricated identity created by a white taxi driver, Leon Carmen. Carmen later claimed he used the false identity because he believed publishers discriminated against white male authors.

Poet Michael Derrick Hudson, having unsuccessfully submitted one of his poems to forty literary journals, placed it in the Fall 2014 issue of Prairie Schooner when he resubmitted it under the name "Yi-Fen Chou." It was subsequently considered for publication in the 2015 edition of the Best American Poetry anthology series edited by author Sherman Alexie. Hudson revealed the use of a pseudonym to Alexie when he learned of the potential inclusion. The incident caused debate concerning whether identity politics were interfering with the discernment of literary quality.

Writer Aaron Barry revealed in July 2025 that he had placed 47 "intentionally bad" poems in various journals under a wide variety of invented personas. The identities included "b.h. fein" (using the pronouns "it's/complicated"), "dirt hogg sauvage respectfully," and "Adele Nwankwo," who described herself as a "gender-fluid member of the Nigerian diaspora." He told The Free Press, "I was just not in the demographic [that certain journals] would even consider accepting in some cases." He cited the Ern Malley hoax and the Grievance studies affair as inspirations.

== Related issues ==
=== Fake memoirs ===
Some pieces' authors are uncontested, but the writers are untruthful about themselves to such a degree that the books are functionally forgeries – rather than forging in the name of an expert or authority, the authors falsely claim such authority for themselves. This usually takes the form of autobiographical works as fake memoirs. Its modern form is most common with "misery lit" books, in which the author claims to have suffered illness, parental abuse, and/or drug addiction during their upbringing, yet recovered well enough to write of their struggles. The 1971 book Go Ask Alice is officially anonymous, but claims to be taken from the diary of an actual drug abuser; later investigation showed that the work is almost certainly fictitious, however. A recent example is the 2003 book A Million Little Pieces by James Frey, wherein Frey claimed to experience fighting drug addiction in rehab; the claimed events were fictional, yet not presented as such.

Other forms considered literary hoaxes are when an author asserts an identity and history for themselves that is not accurate. Asa Earl Carter wrote under the pseudonym Forrest Carter; Forrest Carter claimed to be a half-Cherokee descendent who grew up in native culture, but the real Asa Earl Carter was a white man from Alabama. Forrest Carter's persona thus possessed a similar false authenticity as a forged work would, in both their memoir and their fiction. Similarly, Nasdijj and Margaret Seltzer also falsely claimed Native American descent to help market their works. Danny Santiago claimed to be a young Latino growing up in East Los Angeles, yet the author (whose real name was Daniel Lewis James) was a Midwesterner in his 70s.

=== Sockpuppetry ===
One form of literary fraud involves authors creating false online identities — a practice known as sockpuppeting — to promote their own books while undermining the work of others. An early example was Scharmel Iris, who used the pseudonym Vincent Holme to send publishers enthusiastic letters praising his own writing and to solicit financial support from arts patrons. In 2004, an Amazon.com technical error revealed numerous authors who had posted reviews of their own books under false names. Among them was John Rechy, author of City of Night (1963), who had written several five-star reviews of his own work. Later cases included crime writer RJ Ellory and historian Orlando Figes, both of whom anonymously criticized rival authors while promoting their own books on Amazon. In 2016, bestselling thriller writer Stephen Leather also faced accusations of cyberbullying for anonymously creating websites aimed at attacking fellow writers. Earlier, in 2012, Leather openly described using multiple online personas to discuss and promote his books across social media and internet forums.

In 2023, debut fantasy author Cait Corrain was exposed for creating multiple fake Goodreads accounts to post negative reviews of other authors' books, and to praise her own. This prompted publisher Del Rey Books and literary agent Rebecca Podos to terminate their professional relationships with her.

=== Transparent literary fiction ===
Occasionally, it is unclear whether a work is fiction or a forgery. This generally occurs when a work is written intended as a piece of fiction, but through the mouthpiece of a famous historical character; the audience at the time understands that the work is actually written by others imagining what the historical persona might have written or thought. With later generations, this distinction is lost, and the work is treated as authoritatively by the real person. Later yet, the fact that the work was not really by the seeming author resurfaces. In the case of true transparent literary fictions, no deception is involved, and the issue is merely one of misinterpretation. However, this is fairly rare.

Examples of this may include several works of wisdom literature such as the book of Ecclesiastes and the Song of Solomon in the Hebrew Bible. Both works do not directly name an author, but are written from the perspective of King Solomon, and feature poetry and philosophical thoughts from his perspective that can switch between first and third-person perspectives. The books may not have been intended to be taken as actually from the hand of Solomon, but this became tangled, and many later generations did assume they were directly from Solomon's hand. The fact that it is not clear if any deception was involved makes many scholars reluctant to call the work forgeries, however, even those that take the modern scholarly view that they were unlikely to have been written by Solomon due to the work only being quoted by others many centuries after Solomon's death.

For more disputed examples, some New Testament scholars believe that pseudepigrapha in the New Testament epistles can be explained as such transparent fictions. Richard Bauckham, for example, writes that for the Second Epistle of Peter, "Petrine authorship was intended to be an entirely transparent fiction." This view is contested. Bart Ehrman writes that if a religiously prescriptive document was widely known to be not actually from the authority it claimed, it would not be taken seriously. Therefore, the claim of authorship by Peter only makes sense if the intent was indeed to falsely claim the authority of a respected figure in such epistles.

== See also ==
- Anthony Godby Johnson
- B. Wongar
- Clifford Irving
- Dave Pelzer
- Misery literature
- Mark Hoffman
- Found manuscript
- Ghostwriter
- Hitler Diaries
- John Payne Collier
- Journalistic scandal
- JT LeRoy
- Outline of forgery
- Pseudepigrapha
