= Misery literature =

Literature depicting suffering

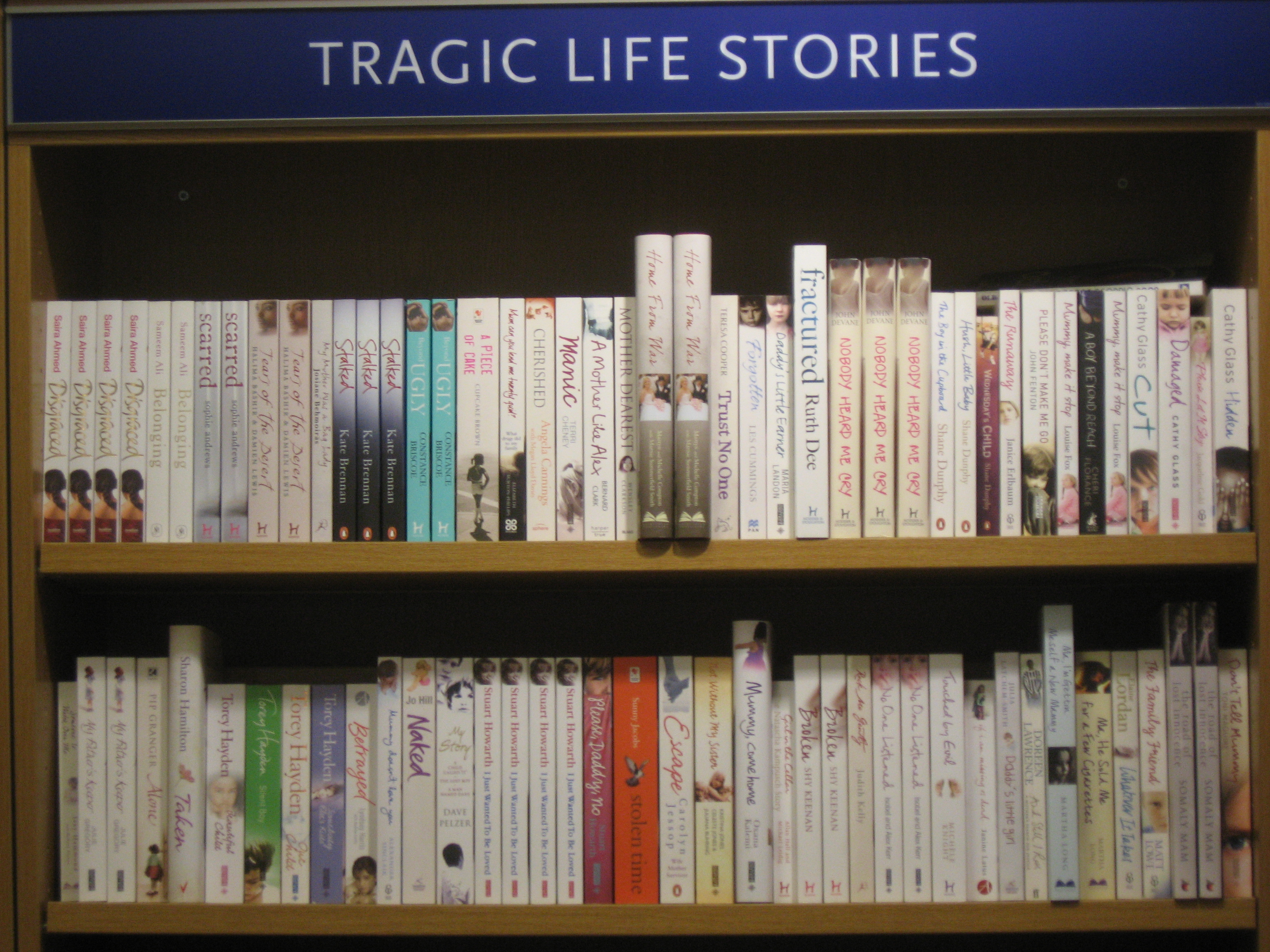
Shelves full of 'misery lit' at WHSmith

Misery literature, also called misery lit, misery porn, misery memoirs and trauma porn, is a literary genre dwelling on trauma, mental and physical abuse, destitution, or other enervating trials suffered by the protagonists or, allegedly, the writer (in the case of memoirs). While in a broad sense the genre is as at least as old as mass-market fiction (e.g., Les Misérables), the terms misery lit and misery porn are usually applied pejoratively to steamy potboilers, schlock horror, and lurid autobiographical wallows of dubious authenticity, especially those without a happy ending. Misery literature has also been proven to be a popular genre for literary hoaxes in which authors claim to reveal painful stories from their past.

Works in the genre typically—though not exclusively—begin in the subject's childhood, and often involve suffering some mistreatment, physical or sexual abuse, or neglect, perpetrated by an adult authority figure, often a parent or guardian. These tales usually culminate in some sort of emotional catharsis, redemption or escape from the abuse or situation. They are often written in the first person. It is also sometimes called "pathography."

Helen Forrester was credited with inventing the misery memoir genre with the bestseller Twopence to Cross the Mersey in 1974. Critics such as Pat Jordan and Geraldine Bedell trace the beginning of the genre to A Child Called "It", a 1995 memoir by American Dave Pelzer, in which he details the abuse he claims to have suffered at the hands of his alcoholic mother, and two subsequent books which continue the story. Pelzer's three books—all recovery narratives dealing with his childhood—created considerable controversy, including doubt as to the veracity of the claims. While the books spent a combined total of 448 weeks on the New York Times paperback nonfiction bestseller list, Pelzer acknowledges purchasing and reselling many thousands of his own books.

Jung Chang's Wild Swans (1992) and Frank McCourt's Angela's Ashes (1996) are seen by Shane Hegarty as seminal works establishing the genre.

Some critics position Hanya Yanagihara's A Little Life (2015) within a lineage of trauma-focused literature that has dominated the past two decades — starting with the boom in misery memoirs in the early 2000s — where sensational personal narratives of abuse and neglect became bestsellers. They see the genre has evolved into literary fiction where pain and trauma are aestheticized rather than simply recounted, including autofictional works by authors like Karl Ove Knausgård, Sheila Heti, Garth Greenwell and others whose writings center on emotional suffering. They see the genre prizes the depiction of pain as a marker of artistic seriousness or moral depth.

== Popularity ==
=== History ===
Katarzyna Szmigiero argues that literature has always been drawn to darkness, cruelty, and suffering. From ancient myths and medieval ballads to Renaissance tragedy, classic works are saturated with violence, sexual transgression, and death. Eighteenth-century novels like Samuel Richardson's Clarissa and Pamela center on female vulnerability, coercion, and misery, even when they end "happily." Gothic fiction intensifies this fascination through excess and shock. Victorian literature continues the pattern, dwelling on injustice and suffering, especially of women and children, in works by Emily Brontë, Charles Dickens, and Thomas Hardy. Explicit depictions of pain and moral outrage are not modern aberrations but a long-standing strategy designed to provoke strong emotional responses from readers.

=== Success in the early 2000s ===
In 2007, misery literature was described as "the book world's biggest boom sector" by Anthony Barnes in The Independent. Works in the genre comprised 11 of the top 100 bestselling English paperbacks of 2006, selling nearly 2 million copies between them. The Waterstones chain of British book retailers even instituted a discrete "Painful Lives" section; Borders Books followed suit with "Real Lives". At the WHSmith chain, the section is titled "Tragic Life Stories"; in each case side-stepping the awkward dilemma of whether to categorize the books under fiction or non-fiction. The readership for these books was estimated to be "80% or 90% female". Roughly 80% of the sales of misery literature were made not in conventional bookstores but in mass-market outlets such as Asda and Tesco.

== Criticism ==
The genre has been criticized in connection with discussions about false memories. Some of the genre's authors have said they write in order to come to terms with their traumatic memories, and to help readers do the same. Supporters of the genre state the genre's popularity indicates a growing cultural willingness to directly confront topics—specifically child sexual abuse—that once would have been ignored or swept under the rug.

However, a common criticism of the genre is the suggestion that its appeal lies in prurience and voyeurism. The Times writer Carol Sarler suggests the popularity of the genre indicates a culture "utterly in thrall to paedophilia". Other critics locate the genre's popular appeal in its combination of moral outrage and titillation.

According to sociologist Frank Furedi, misery memoirs suggest that abuse, humiliation and suffering are not exceptional experiences but an ordinary part of modern life, and in doing so, they make extreme experiences seem normal. He calls this the pornography of emotional hurt. "As a social scientist", Furedi writes, "I am uncomfortable with the trend for intelligent adults to present themselves as debased victims." He also points out, that while public confessions are widely praised as courageous acts, people who choose to keep their struggles private are criticised as being in denial, and the traditional "stiff upper lip" is viewed not as resilience but as evidence of psychological problems.

Furedi writes:

Misery memoirs sell because today it has become commonplace to seek meaning through degrading experiences. In providing graphic details about people's lived humiliations, these memoirs make us feel more comfortable with our own existences. It is sad that we need to gain a sense of meaning and calm by reading about the degradation of others; yet the fact is, we live in a world where the victim trumps the hero. Some writers are happy to invent stories of painful abuse because they recognise that being a victim has public appeal today.

In her book Popular Trauma Culture: Selling the Pain of Others in the Mass Media (2011) Anne Rothe analyzes how trauma, especially Holocaust discourse, has become a cultural paradigm in American mass media. She argues that the ways in which the Holocaust is popularly discussed (with a melodramatic structure of "good vs. evil" and the central figures of victim/survivor and perpetrator) shape how personal suffering is widely represented in media and literature. This pattern becomes a model for consuming trauma in broader culture.

Rothe also analyzes why fabricated or heavily embellished fake misery memoirs succeed commercially. She argues their popularity reveals that readers are not primarily seeking truth, but believable trauma, and that authenticity is judged emotionally ("this feels real"), not factually. Rothe argues that misery memoirs elevate the survivor as a morally unassailable figure: survivors are positioned beyond critique and questioning their narratives can be framed as cruelty or denial. Trauma becomes a source of unquestioned legitimacy. She points out this dynamic discourages nuanced discussion about memory, narrative construction, and social responsibility.

== Literary hoaxes ==
=== Early examples ===
One early hoax was the 1836 book Awful Disclosures of Maria Monk, or, The Hidden Secrets of a Nun's Life in a Convent Exposed, by Maria Monk, which claimed to tell of Monk's abuse in a convent. The book was a fabrication, and although it contained a variety of factual errors, it became a widely read bestseller for several decades as it capitalized on anti-Catholic sentiment in the United States.

Actress Joan Lowell's bestselling 1929 memoir The Cradle of the Deep is one of the first celebrity memoir frauds of the modern media age. The book claimed to tell the true story of Lowell's adventurous childhood at sea, but journalists and sailors soon exposed many of its episodes as fabricated or exaggerated. Rather than ending her career, the scandal increased public fascination with the book. A 2026 New Yorker article argues that Lowell anticipated later memoir controversies, especially James Frey and his disputed A Million Little Pieces, by showing how publishers, media attention, and audiences' desire for "authentic" personal stories of suffering and adventure could turn literary deception into commercial success.

=== From 1960s to early 2000s ===
==== Holocaust hoaxes ====
The Holocaust has been the subject of several notable literary hoaxes by authors who either falsely claim to have lived through it, or were in fact Holocaust survivors but falsified their experiences. Such hoaxes include The Painted Bird (1965) by Jerzy Kosinski, Memorias del infierno (Memoir of Hell) (1978) by Enric Marco, Fragments: Memories of a Wartime Childhood (1995) by Binjamin Wilkomirski, Misha: A Mémoire of the Holocaust Years (1997) by Misha Defonseca, and Angel at the Fence by Herman Rosenblat (which was planned to be published in 2009, but publication was cancelled). Hannah: From Dachau to the Olympics and Beyond is a 2005 Holocaust biography written by Jean Goodwin Messinger about Hannah Pence. In 2009 it was revealed that Pence had fabricated her whole life story.

University researcher Benito Bermejo, who revealed Marco's memoir to be a lie, said:

The alarm was first rung after listening to what this man had to say... because normally the ex-prisoners felt a certain reluctance to dwell on the most painful aspects of their life. They can explain bad things but, precisely because they have lived them, they are reticent about making a 'show' out of them.

In 1994, Australian author Helen Darville, now Helen Dale, published the novel The Hand That Signed the Paper under the name Helen Demidenko. The book depicts a Ukrainian family cooperating with Nazi Germany during the Holocaust. It received Australia's most prestigious literary award, the Miles Franklin Award, but soon sparked accusations of antisemitism. Controversy intensified after it emerged that Darville had fabricated a Ukrainian identity to suggest the story drew on her own family background, and she was later also accused of plagiarism. In 2017, Dale again faced criticism after being accused of plagiarizing material from social media posts.

==== Moral panics ====
Beatrice Sparks, who claimed to be a Mormon youth counselor, was an author and serial fraudster known for publishing books presented as the "real diaries" of troubled teenagers. These works addressed contemporary issues such as drug abuse, Satanism, teenage pregnancy, and AIDS, framing them as cautionary tales. Her most famous books are Go Ask Alice (1971) and Jay's Journal (1979), both of which were published anonymously.

Two works that sparked moral panics in the United States are Sybil (1973) by Flora Rheta Schreiber and Michelle Remembers (1980) by Lawrence Pazder. Sybil tells the "true story" of a woman suffering from multiple personality disorder (now known as dissociative identity disorder) and the psychoanalyst, Cornelia B. Wilbur, who "cures" her. Both Sybil and Michelle Remembers promoted the idea of repressed memories and forgotten childhood traumas. Sybil was also adapted into a television film, and following the book and movie, diagnoses of multiple personality disorder increased while Michelle Remembers served as the spark for the Satanic panic. According to Lawrence Pazder's then wife, Pazder saw the television film based on Sybil and said that he had a similar patient. This was the initial seed of the story that became Michelle Remembers. The factual accuracy of both works has since been disputed. Journalist Debbie Nathan, in her book Sybil Exposed, discusses how psychoanalyst Wilbur, Shirley Mason (the real person behind Sybil), and Schreiber (the author of Sybil) carried out a deception—partly knowingly, partly under self-delusion—in order to sell books, the film, and other products through a sensational story.

American Laurel Rose Willson has posed as both a victim of satanic ritual abuse and a Holocaust survivor. She wrote the 1988 book Satan's Underground under the pseudonym Lauren Stratford. In 1989, Willson appeared together with Michelle Smith on The Oprah Winfrey Show. Smith, along with her psychiatrist Lawrence Pazder, had written Michelle Remembers, the book that sparked the Satanic ritual abuse panic. Oprah Winfrey presented both stories as unquestionable facts. After being exposed, Willson began posing as a concentration camp survivor named Laura Grabowski. She also posed with another impostor, Binjamin Wilkomirski. As Stratford, she also wrote an "autobiography" called Stripped Naked, about her multiple personality disorder.

==== The Nobel Peace Prize winner controversy ====
Some memoirs of suffering have included elements of both truth and fiction. These include I, Rigoberta Menchú (1983) by Rigoberta Menchú, an Indigenous Guatemalan activist who won the Nobel Peace Prize in 1992. More than a decade after the publication of Menchú's memoir, anthropologist David Stoll challenged its accuracy, claiming she altered details about her family history, education, and key events, including the deaths of her brothers—a younger brother whom Menchú said she saw die of starvation never existed—and her schooling. Despite these allegations, the Nobel Committee refused to revoke her prize, emphasizing it was awarded for her advocacy and social justice work, not factual testimony. The dispute became one of the most divisive controversies in American anthropology, alongside debates over Margaret Mead and Napoleon Chagnon.

==== The misery lit boom ====
In the 1990s and early 2000s several memoirs and novels marketed as having autobiographical status, telling of childhood miseries as a result of parental abuse, drug use, illness and the like, were exposed as hoaxes. Examples include A Rock and a Hard Place: One Boy's Triumphant Story (1993) by "Anthony Godby Johnson," Sarah (2000) and The Heart Is Deceitful Above All Things (2001) by JT LeRoy, Don't Ever Tell (published as Kathy's Story in the US) (2005) by Kathy O'Beirne and Love and Consequences (2008) by Margaret Seltzer.

The JT LeRoy hoax by Laura Albert and the Anthony Godby Johnson hoax by Vicky Fraginals share several similarities. In both cases, a middle-aged woman invented an abused boy, claimed to be his caretaker, and published a fictional autobiography with the support of a prominent writer. Albert contacted Dennis Cooper while posing as "Terminator," a troubled street hustler resembling a character from Cooper's novels. She gained Cooper's trust, receiving editorial guidance and his support in introducing "JT LeRoy" to writers such as Bruce Benderson and influential Manhattan editors. Fraginals, posing as the abused, HIV-positive "Tony", had a five-year friendship with Armistead Maupin, who later fictionalized the experience in his novel The Night Listener (2000). Furthermore, both deceptions were maintained through extensive communication with writers, celebrities, and fans, while the fictional identities evolved over time. Both hoaxes also eventually involved another woman publicly impersonating the fabricated character: Albert hired her niece Savannah Knoop to perform as JT LeRoy, and TV producer Lesley Karsten took over the Anthony Godby Johnson hoax from its creator Fraginals.

In 2011, JT LeRoy's former agent, Ira Silverberg, commented on the recurring revelations of memoirs being exposed as fabricated:

The biggest problem publishers have is that the fiction category isn't as good as it used to be. In the age of Oprah and celebrity reality television and true tales, everyone wants a spokesperson for some horrible incident or ... tragedy.

James Frey's memoir A Million Little Pieces (2003) was initially marketed as non-fiction, and attracted considerable controversy when it was revealed that significant portions of it were fabricated. In 2005, Oprah Winfrey selected A Million Little Pieces for her influential Oprah's Book Club, calling it gut-wrenching and inspirational. The endorsement catapulted the book to the top of bestseller lists. Frey became a celebrity author, and the book sold millions of copies. However, after it was revealed that Frey had embellished and invented some of the material in his memoir, Winfrey invited Frey back on The Oprah Winfrey Show for a follow-up interview in January 2006, confronting him sharply on national TV.

In 2004 a scandal unraveled around Norma Khouri's bestselling book Forbidden Love (2003, published in the US as Honor Lost). The book claimed to tell the true story of Khouri's best friend "Dalia", a young Jordanian woman supposedly murdered by her father in an "honour killing" after falling in love with a Christian soldier. Investigations by journalists of The Sydney Morning Herald discovered that Khouri had not been living in Jordan during the years described in the book. Investigators and Jordanian critics also identified numerous factual inaccuracies in the book, including errors about Jordanian geography, customs, and laws. Separate from the literary fraud, Khouri was also accused of extensive financial scams and frauds in Chicago before moving to Australia. Chicago police reopened investigations after the literary scandal broke, and sources described Khouri as a highly skilled con artist.

==== Humanitarian hoaxes ====
In 2011 a scandal erupted around Three Cups of Tea, a hugely successful 2006 memoir by Greg Mortenson and David Oliver Relin. The book told the story of Mortenson, a mountaineer who supposedly became inspired to build schools for girls in Pakistan and Afghanistan after villagers rescued him following a failed K2 climb. It became an international bestseller and was widely promoted in schools, universities, and even the U.S. military. A 60 Minutes investigation and a separate exposé by writer Jon Krakauer questioned the truthfulness of Mortenson's story. Krakauer published Three Cups of Deceit, arguing that large portions of the memoir were fabricated or heavily embellished. The controversy was especially shocking because Mortenson had been celebrated as a humanitarian hero.

Jon Krakauer writes in Three Cups of Deceit:

It turns out that Mortenson's books and public statements are permeated with falsehoods. The image of Mortenson that has been created for public consumption is an artifact born of fantasy, audacity, and an apparently insatiable hunger for esteem. Mortenson has lied about the noble deeds he has done, the risks he has taken, the people he has met, the number of schools he has built. Three Cups of Tea has much in common with A Million Little Pieces, the infamous autobiography by James Frey that was exposed as a sham. But Frey, unlike Mortenson, didn't use his phony memoir to solicit tens of millions of dollars in donations from unsuspecting readers, myself among them.

Another story of humanitarian heroism, Somaly Mam's 2008 memoir, The Road of Lost Innocence: The True Story of a Cambodian Heroine, was exposed by a 2014 investigation for fabricating key biographical details. Mam's memoir recounted a horrifying youth in Cambodia: being sold into sexual slavery by her grandfather, enduring years of severe abuse, and ultimately escaping to become a heroic rescuer of other trafficking victims. The exposé further alleged that Mam coached other girls in her foundation's care to rehearse and exaggerate their own trauma to Western donors and media.

=== 2020s ===
In 2020 Samantha Cookes, a British serial fraudster who often used the alias "Carrie Jade Williams", won a prestigious essay-writing competition run by the Financial Times and The Bodley Head with an essay in which she claimed to suffer from Huntington's disease, a terminal condition. The essay attracted widespread sympathy and praise, helping Cookes establish herself as an emerging literary voice. She received writing opportunities, media attention, and arts funding based on the fabricated persona. Investigations later revealed that both her illness and much of her personal story were fictitious. Beyond her literary fraud, Cookes used harrowing stories of suffering to manipulate online communities as a "sickfluencer" and the Irish state to receive financial aid and social welfare. In 2024 she was jailed for three years for deliberate fraud and theft.

Utah woman Kouri Richins published the children's grief book Are You with Me? after her husband Eric Richins' 2022 death. She promoted the book as a tool for children navigating the loss of a loved one, and it features an illustrated story of a father with angel wings watching over his son. In 2026, Richins was convicted of murdering her husband by administering a fatal dose of fentanyl in a cocktail. Prosecutors argued Richins planned the killing and created the book as a calculated cover-up to profit financially and appear to be a devoted, grieving mother. The juxtaposition of the book's message with the murder conviction drew intense public scrutiny, and the proceedings became widely known as the "grief author murder trial."

In 2024 Danish influencer and Berlingske critic Katherine Diez was engulfed in a major plagiarism scandal and a controversy around her memoir. In January Reddit users noticed similarities between Diez's reviews and Instagram posts and the work of other journalists and authors. Subsequent reviews by Berlingske and Elle identified widespread examples of copied passages, unattributed quotations, and appropriated ideas. It also emerged that Diez had overstated her academic credentials. Later that year she addressed the scandal in her memoir I egen barm (In My Own Bosom). The book recounts her childhood, her relationship with television chef and screenwriter Adam Price, as well as her struggles with cocaine use and an eating disorder. Many literary critics expressed disappointment that only a small portion of the memoir dealt with the plagiarism scandal. Some argued that by focusing primarily on her personal suffering, Diez framed the story in a way that made public criticism difficult. Adam Price also objected publicly, arguing that the memoir revealed intimate details of his private life and affected his family, but he ultimately decided not to press charges.

In 2025, several bestselling memoirs' veracity was questioned and widely discussed. In the UK, an Observer article revealed that the origin story of Raynor Winn's The Salt Path (2018) was fabricated. In the US, venture capitalist Amy Griffin's trauma memoir The Tell (2025) was investigated by The New York Times, and Griffin was sued by her former classmate for using the classmate's life events in the book as her own. In Sweden, the national public television broadcaster SVT published a documentary series, Hatet (The Hate), which examined influencer Joakim Lundell's public persona and childhood trauma claims. In his 2017 memoir Monster, Lundell claimed his mother had abused him and had repeated this story in the media for years. SVT's researchers could not verify these events in Lundell's records, even though he had claimed documentation of his abuse existed. Another documentary series on TV4, in which Lundell repeated the accusations, was condemned by the media ethics board for violating good journalistic practice. Lundell also confessed that the traumatic memories from his childhood only came to him when he was 31 years old, just before he began writing his autobiography. This, like Amy Griffin's book, sparked a conversation about the existence of repressed memories, and Lundell was compared to another infamous case: that of Thomas Quick (real name Sture Bergwall) who in the 1990s, while undergoing recovered-memory therapy on benzodiazepines, confessed to and was convicted of several murders he had not committed.

In 2026, Jason Arday’s memoir, Great and Unfortunate Things, was marketed as an account of adversity, illness, resilience and academic achievement. The memoir attracted scrutiny following reports concerning allegations of plagiarism in Arday’s academic work, inconsistencies in his backstory, and discrepancies between his original book proposal and the published account. The controversy also prompted questions about the responsibilities of his publisher, Simon & Schuster. The Observer reported that the controversy echoed the Salt Path scandal, renewing debate about fact-checking in memoir publishing. As publishers traditionally rely heavily on authors’ accounts, questions were raised about their responsibility to verify extraordinary claims. The newspaper cited as an example how the book opens with Arday’s account of volunteering in Brazilian favelas. His biography on the Simon & Schuster website stated that this was facilitated by WaterAid, even though the charity later told The Telegraph that it did not send volunteers abroad.

== Author's fake identities ==
Alyson Miller argues, that the author's identity in fabricated misery memoirs is validated less by empirical truth than by emotional performance. Readers respond to how convincingly suffering is rendered, not to whether it can be verified. A memoirist's identity becomes "true" insofar as it produces the correct emotional effects — shock, pity, moral outrage. Miller points out fake memoirs destabilize the boundary between authentic and inauthentic identities. A convincing impostor reveals that the markers of "real" traumatic identity, such as voice, detail, pain, sincerity, are reproducible. This creates cultural anxiety: if trauma identities can be mimicked, then authenticity itself becomes uncertain. Miller quotes journalist Tim Adams to suggest that:

in the context of misery memoirs, the 'real' is a notion that exists only in relation to the emotional investment of readers with the presented text. The authors of these texts [--] consciously manipulate the feelings provoked in readers during the intimacy of reading, and seek to encourage an empathic connection that is difficult to break.

Miller situates misery memoirs within a broader confessional culture in which selfhood is produced through disclosure. Identity is something one puts on display, often in increasingly extreme forms, to be recognised as meaningful. Trauma becomes a narrative technology through which the self is made legible to publishers, media, and readers.

=== Authors appropriating the lives and work of others ===
Alyson Miller also points out that as some misery memoirs directly involve specific individuals in their accounts of abuse, from relatives to representatives from institutions like the church or school, they reshape the stories, and even identities, of those people.

When journalist Chloe Hadjimatheou interviewed people portrayed by Raynor Winn in The Salt Path, many said they felt hurt and disappointed by how they had been depicted. They described the portrayals as patronizing and unflattering, with Winn often treating condescendingly people who had helped her and her husband. One person said he felt insulted because the book downplayed his generosity and instead presented him as selfish. He also pointed out Winn presents the love between her and her husband as something that elevates them and uses it to look down on others, ending: "They are very unlucky to have such an unkind way of looking at others." Some portrayed in The Salt Path had asked for an apology from Winn and her agent, but received no answer.

In a similar way, in The Painted Bird Jerzy Kosinski portrayed as cruel and monstrous the Polish people who had helped protect him and his family during World War II. Although a network of Polish Catholics had hidden the family at great personal risk, Kosinski later vilified not only those who had aided him but also the Polish nation more broadly in the eyes of international readers.

Kosinski was also repeatedly accused of appropriating the work of others. There were several investigations into plagiarism, and an exposé by The Village Voice highlighted research by Barbara Tepa Lupack showing that substantial passages in Kosinski's books had been directly translated from obscure Polish-language sources. His novel Being There was also noted for its close similarities to the prewar Polish bestseller Kariera Nikodema Dyzmy (The Career of Nicodemus Dyzma) by Tadeusz Dolega-Mostowicz.

In 2025, Algerian woman Saâda Arbane accused the Algerian-French author Kamel Daoud of appropriating her life story for his Prix Goncourt-winning novel Houris. Arbane had confided deeply personal experiences to Daoud's wife, who was her psychiatrist, only to later recognize aspects of her life in the novel despite having explicitly refused permission for her experiences to be used. Arbane subsequently filed lawsuits against Daoud in both Algeria and France. Ironically, the Goncourt jury had praised Daoud for giving "voice to the suffering associated with a dark period in Algeria's history, particularly that of women."

=== Suggested explanations for distorting events ===
When Hadjimatheou interviewed relatives of Winn — whose real name is Sally Walker — and her husband Tim Walker, some described the couple as pathological liars and fantasists, who have a need to present themselves as victims. Mira Michalowska, who knew Kosinski during her time as a journalist in New York, called him "an absolute mythomaniac", and according to Kosinski's biographer James Park Sloan, Kosinski was both a pathological liar and obsessively controlling. It has been argued that he displayed traits associated with borderline personality structures, constantly defending himself against deep fears of abandonment and despair.

According to Sloan:

Kosinski transmuted his wartime years into a version of the most primal and universal of plots: he was the hero and victim; everybody else was a villain. The trouble came when others took up his script. It served all too conveniently the purposes of various groups in need of a governing myth.

In 2011 memoirist Mary Karr commented: "I'm always suspect of a memoir where someone becomes a hero," and said she believed that most memoirs revealed as hoaxes reflect their author's "outsized narcissism". When asked for his opinion, psychologist Oliver James said some people "have a weak sense of self and only feel real when they are pretending to be someone else."

=== Authors faking identities in other genres ===
In some cases, authors fabricate traumatic personal histories or construct fictional identities and personas, even when their writing is not autobiographical. In 2019, The New Yorker published Ian Parker's investigating article A Suspense Novelist's Trail of Deceptions, examining the life of thrillerist Daniel Mallory (who uses the pen name A. J. Finn) author of The Woman in the Window (2018). The article showed that Mallory had repeatedly fabricated aspects of his personal history, including claims of brain cancer, family deaths and tragedies, and academic achievements. It also highlighted similarities between the The Woman in the Window and the plot of the movie Copycat. The article portrayed Mallory as a charismatic and talented figure whose elaborate stories helped shape both his professional image and relationships within publishing, and raised a wide conversation about broader questions of deception, sympathy, and the literary industry's attraction to compelling personal narratives.

After the exposé author Jessa Crispin pointed out that Mallory's literary career, too, began with a fake memoir. While studying at Oxford, he wrote an essay falsely describing his mother's death from cancer and his own brain tumor diagnosis, catching the attention of Craig Raine, the editor of Areté literary magazine. Although Mallory did not want the essay to be published, it gained him professional opportunities. According to Crispin, Mallory's case reflects a wider trend in publishing, where authors are expected to share the experiences they write about, making personal histories part of a work's appeal. She summarizes: "Apologies to Barthes, but the author didn't die, she became the text", and contends Mallory used claimed similarities between himself and his fictional characters to strengthen this sense of authenticity and market his work.

Crispin argues that hoaxes often succeed because the publishing industry is largely shaped by white, middle-class women who may have limited familiarity with marginalized communities, leading them to favor stories that align with existing assumptions and reinforce stereotypes. She concludes:

there is another story these fakes are telling that we want to hear: the story of redemption through the written word. Even if you come from the most hardscrabble of circumstances, even if you have been wiped out by the tidal waves of fate, you can better yourself and your life through literature. It's the literary version of the American dream, pulling yourself up by your bootstraps, but in this case, your bootstraps is your manuscript.

In a similar manner, Australian Belle Gibson built her public image around false claims that she had terminal brain cancer and had prolonged her life through healthy eating and lifestyle changes rather than conventional medicine. She used this story to market her wellness brand, mobile app, and cookbook, presenting herself as living proof of her methods' success. In 2015 investigations revealed that Gibson had never had cancer, exposing how fabricated experiences had been used to build trust, publicity, and commercial success.

==== Sockpuppeting ====
There have also been several instances of authors creating false online identities — a practice known as sockpuppeting — to promote their own books while attacking or criticizing the work of others. An early example is Scharmel Iris, who adopted the pseudonym Vincent Holme to send publishers flattering letters about his own work and to seek financial support from arts patrons. In 2004, a technical error on Amazon.com exposed the identities of many authors who had reviewed their own books under pseudonyms. Among those identified was John Rechy, author of the bestselling novel City of Night (1963), who had written multiple five-star reviews praising his own work. More recent examples include crime writer RJ Ellory and historian Orlando Figes, who both trashed their rivals and praised their own books under pseudonyms on Amazon. In 2016 bestselling thriller writer Stephen Leather was accused of cyberbullying by putting up websites to attack fellow writers. In 2012, Leather said:

As soon as my book is out I'm on Facebook and Twitter several times a day talking about it. I'll go on to several forums, the well-known forums, and post there under my name and under various other names and various other characters. You build up this whole network of characters who talk about your books and sometimes have conversations with yourself.

== Discussions about truth and publishers' responsibility ==
Genealogist Sharon Sergeant, who has been involved in exposing several fraudulent Holocaust memoirs, says she began this work because she wanted to uncover the truth in cases where human tragedy is exploited for personal gain. In the case of authors who falsely presented themselves as Holocaust survivors, their lies have been said to aid the cause of Holocaust deniers: a single fabricated story can cast doubt on the entire horrific truth.

In 2025 an Observer investigation exposed that the story of Raynor Winn's best-selling memoir The Salt Path was fraudulent. Several media wrote about the case, and the wider question of truth in memoirs, a debate that emerges every time a supposedly autobiographical story is exposed as fabricated. Many compared the backlash to the case of American author James Frey, whose 2003 memoir A Million Little Pieces was exposed as largely fabricated. The Times pointed out that The Salt Path became a publishing phenomenon largely because it was framed as a true story, and it appealed to readers' enduring fascination with misery memoirs, whose resonance depends on the assumption of factual truth.

In the wake of the scandal, criticism was also directed at Winn's publisher, Penguin Random House, for an apparent failure to properly scrutinise her manuscript. While some of the sharper critiques were deemed to rely on hindsight, raising the question of whether editors can reasonably be expected to act as investigators — such as by interviewing an author's wider circle to verify claims — it was pointed out there is a more credible concern that the publishing industry prioritises commercially promising genres, even at the cost of endorsing repetitive or imitative books. Amelia Fairney, a former Penguin Books communications director now working against disinformation, wrote in The Observer that publishing has a "fact-checking problem" driven by profit, adding that challenging the authenticity of a hugely successful author like Raynor Winn requires extreme confidence.

In the US, a similar discussion took place when a 2025 New York Times article investigated the bestselling memoir The Tell by billionaire investor Amy Griffin. The book describes her recovering memories of childhood sexual abuse during psychedelic-assisted therapy (specifically MDMA). The sales were boosted by Griffin's wealth, connections, and endorsements from high-profile celebrities, including the three influential book club leaders Oprah Winfrey, Reese Witherspoon and Jenna Bush Hager. Critics pointed out that memories recovered through drug-assisted therapy, especially decades later, can be unreliable or influenced by suggestion. The NYT article also pointed out Griffin and her husband have financial ties to psychedelic-therapy ventures, raising concerns that the book may indirectly promote the treatment. Many noted that the Satanic ritual abuse panic also originated from a later discredited memoir based on repressed memories, with Vox pointing out The Tell "appears at a moment when pseudoscience, conspiracy theories, and debunked medical techniques are all making an aggressive resurgence."

Griffin's memoir, too, was compared to James Frey's A Million Little Pieces. Whitney Frick, Griffin's editor at The Dial Press, an imprint of Penguin Random House, commented: "Book publishers are not investigators." Critics, however, pointed out these dramatic stories always have an impact. The allegations of abuse remain unconfirmed by independent evidence or other alleged victims. According to the NYT article, "Ms. Griffin describes the teacher she accuses of attacking her with enough specificity that some readers [--] were able to discern his identity, even though she gave him a pseudonym." Concernes were raised, that a teacher with an untarnished record has been judged a rapist without any chance to present his defence. One critic pointed out fabricating a memoir about sexual abuse makes the lives of sexual-assault victims more difficult, while another wrote: "'Believe women' should be treated as a starting point, not an entire philosophy."

In March 2026 a former classmate sued Griffin, her ghostwriter Sam Lansky, and Penguin Random House, claiming the story of The Tell was actually based on her experiences, not Griffin's. She said Griffin used her childhood trauma to help write the bestseller.

Author Alexander Larman commented the case:

[W]hatever happens with The Tell, it is yet another blow to the institution of memoir, where publishers are increasingly being urged to perform due diligence to make sure such accounts are verifiably accurate, rather than simply the author's own interpretation, or 'their truth'.

== Misery literature and trauma culture ==
Anne Rothe provides one of the first scholarly analyses of misery memoirs in her book Popular Trauma Culture (2011). She treats misery memoirs as a symptom of a wider cultural economy of trauma, where pain becomes something that can be sold, and the more extreme the suffering, the higher the perceived authenticity. She argues trauma functions in our society as cultural capital, and that publishers, media outlets, and readers all participate in this economy.

In her 2021 essay The Case Against the Trauma Plot, critic Parul Sehgal argues that in much contemporary literature and storytelling, the "trauma plot" has become a dominant and limiting narrative structure, that focuses almost obsessively on a character's past suffering as the defining force of their personality and actions. Instead of directing curiosity toward what might happen next, as in a traditional plot like the marriage plot, the trauma plot constantly looks backward: "What happened to her?" rather than "What will she become?" or "What will she do?" According to Sehgal, the structure often comes with an implicit moral weight, as if to suggest that characters — or people — are entitled to special status or understanding because of their wounds.

In a similar vein, author Will Self writes in his 2021 essay A Posthumous Shock: How Everything Became Trauma, that trauma as we currently understand it — especially the symptoms associated with PTSD and "traumatic memory" — is not a timeless, universal human experience, but rather a distinctively modern cultural and psychological phenomenon shaped by the conditions of modernity. He points out that where literary studies once valued irony, ambiguity, and skepticism, literary scholars now operate within a moralized framework in which doubt appears unethical and questioning trauma claims, or even bracketing them, is treated as callous or reactionary. Self contends that scholars increasingly treat literature as evidence: of suffering, marginalization, or injury. As a result, criticism slides toward advocacy or witness-bearing, and away from aesthetic judgment or intellectual risk.

Cultural theorist and author Catherine Liu argues in her 2023 essay The Problem with Trauma Culture, that contemporary trauma culture, particularly in liberal, academic, and professional-class contexts, has shifted political and social attention away from material conditions and collective struggle toward individual psychological injury. Liu observes that trauma has become a default lens for explaining social problems, personal dissatisfaction, and political conflict.

Liu writes:

By 2021, trauma — its scripts, plots and theories — had finally taken up permanent residency in the Anglophone culture industry, from content production to the managerial ethos. From Disney's "Encanto" to Jason Mott's National Book Award-winning novel, "Hell of a Book," trauma took center stage in the narratives the liberal PMC [professional–managerial class] produces and consumes. The ubiquity of trauma as cultural content has been a huge, uncelebrated victory for progressive psychologists and literature professors. Their ideas about trauma have eclipsed all other ideas of psychological suffering and have been used to promote "resilience" as a very specific form of recovery and healing.

Similarly, Katherine Rowland writes in 2025 in The Guardian, that a whole industry has grown up around the belief that everything counts as trauma. What was once understood as the psyche's response to genuine catastrophe is now framed as a kind of personal asset—something to be claimed, shaped into a story, and carefully managed by the individual. She points out this outlook is mirrored on bookstore shelves: Barnes & Noble alone lists more than 3,300 titles under "anxiety, stress and trauma-related disorders," ranging from memoirs of recovered memories to self-help guides and pop-neuroscience.

== Misery porn in other media ==
The terms "misery porn" and "grief porn" are also used to describe television series, films, and other forms of media. Examples cited by critics include The Handmaid’s Tale (based on Margaret Atwood's novel), The Walking Dead, American Horror Story, Chernobyl, and Game of Thrones, as well as films such as The Whale and The Son.

A 2025 New Yorker review of Chloé Zhao's Hamnet, an adaptation of Maggie O’Farrell's 2020 novel, sparked debate over whether the film could be considered grief porn, or "emotional pornography." According to critics, grief porn emerges when a work of art stops trusting the audience's imagination and instead seeks to elicit emotions through overtly manipulative means. Whereas more complex works leave room for silence, ambiguity, and interpretation, allowing emotions to develop gradually, emotional pornography prioritizes immediate emotional impact through exaggerated suffering, easy sentimentality, and persistent emotional cues designed to provoke a reaction.

The Guardian wrote more extensively about "grief-as-depth" trope, using as examples the film adaptation of Helen Macdonald's memoir H Is for Hawk and The Thing with Feathers, based on Max Porter's novella. These works were cited as part of a broader trend in which representations of grief are used as a shorthand for emotional depth and artistic seriousness.

== See also ==
- Literary forgery
- List of impostors
- Fake memoir
- Grief porn
