= Shout magazine =

Shout magazine may refer to:

- Shout (magazine), a British Teen Magazine
- Shout NY (magazine), a NY Cult Thought and Culture Magazine (1998–2003)
