= Jeff Feuerzeig =

American film director and screenwriter

- Born: 1964 (age 61–62); United States
- Education: New York University
- Occupations: Film director, screenwriter

Jeff Feuerzeig (born 1964) is an American film director and screenwriter best known for The Devil and Daniel Johnston, his profile of cult musician and outsider artist Daniel Johnston, for which he was awarded the Directing prize for Documentary at the 2005 Sundance Film Festival and which was released theatrically in March 2006 by Sony Pictures Classics.

== Life and career ==
Feuerzeig grew up in Hazlet, New Jersey and the Morganville section of Marlboro Township. He came of age just in time to receive the full impact of the punk rock wave and its attendant do-it-yourself aesthetic, an influence that dominates his approach and subject matter to the present. He graduated with honors from Trenton State College in 1986 and immediately enrolled in New York University's six-month Intensive Filmmaking Program, where he studied under Thierry Pathé. He has spent 25 years directing commercials for a wide assortment of corporate clients, including IBM, Delta Air Lines and Budweiser. In 1990, he directed Jon Hendricks: The Freddie Sessions, a profile of the famed jazz singer and member of Lambert, Hendricks & Ross. The half-hour film featured appearances by George Benson, Al Jarreau and Bobby McFerrin and was broadcast nationally on PBS.

=== Half Japanese: The Band That Would Be King (1994) ===
In 1993, marshaling his continuing interest in the outer limits of alternative music, Feuerzeig directed a 16mm feature documentary on brothers Jad and David Fair and their seminal proto-punk band Half Japanese, a passion project that was booked for an independent two-week run at Film Forum in New York and subsequently distributed by Tara Releasing in art-houses nationwide – often in conjunction with the band playing full concerts after the screening.

"Half Japanese has the feel of a complete put-on," wrote Stephen Holden in The New York Times.

=== The Devil and Daniel Johnston (2006) ===
Over a five-year period beginning in 2000, Feuerzeig created a portrait of West Virginia-born cult singer-songwriter and artist Daniel Johnston, whose work was affected by his early-20s onset of manic-depression and schizophrenia. Feuerzeig was inspired by clinical psychologist Kay Redfield Jamison’s Touched with Fire: Manic-Depressive Illness and the Artistic Temperament (1993), and techniques from the New Journalism of the 1970s.

New York Press film critic Matt Zoller Seitz said of Devil: “A true nonfiction film, a movie that tries to do with sound and image what journalists like Nick Tosches (Dino) and Norman Mailer (Armies of the Night) tried to do with prose, bending prose into poetry to find a more subjective route to truth.”

The film appeared on many best of the decade lists. It was named by Mojo Magazine one of the 10 best music documentaries of all time and by Rolling Stone magazine one of the Top 25 music DVDs of all time. On the strength of the film, Feuerzeig spent a year working with Albert Maysles, where he created award-winning short-form documentaries for IBM. He is currently represented by Ridley Scott Associates (RSA) for commercial and television work.

=== The Real Rocky (2011) ===
On October 25, 2011, the ESPN network broadcast The Real Rocky, an original one-hour documentary directed by Feuerzeig as part of its ongoing documentary showcase series, original titled 30 for 30, and more recently re-branded as "ESPN Films." The film chronicles the ongoing controversy surrounding the true identity of the eponymous title character from the Sylvester Stallone Rocky franchise, which public opinion and folk wisdom has long held was based on New Jersey heavyweight boxer Chuck Wepner, “The Bayonne Bleeder,” whose chief claim was that he once went 15 rounds with Muhammad Ali, even knocking him down in the ninth round (by, as it was later revealed, stepping on his foot).

Using collage graphics somewhere between Roy Lichtenstein's Pop Art confections and the ransom note typography of Jamie Reid's Sex Pistols album cover, the film spells out Rocky's influence on Wepner's personal life – much of it catastrophic, such as his descent into cocaine and a brief stint in federal prison. To provide both insider insight and period detail, Feuerzeig assembles a round table of sportswriters and Jersey stalwarts reminiscent of the Carnegie Deli regulars in Woody Allen’s Broadway Danny Rose.

According to Variety’s Brian Lowry, "[F]or anyone familiar with boxing or even just the "Rocky" franchise, "The Real Rocky" – shot partly in black and white to heighten its cinematic feel, and featuring boxing reporters as a sort of Greek chorus – is the genuine article."

=== Author: The JT LeRoy Story (2016) ===
A journalist friend alerted Feuerzeig to the story of writer Laura Albert, who had used an avatar, JT LeRoy, as the credited author of her fiction Sarah and The Heart Is Deceitful Above All Things. “I devoured all the pieces about it and after reading them I just had this feeling there was much more to the story than we were being told. What was glaringly missing was the voice of the author of the fiction both on and off the page. I wanted to hear that voice.”

Feuerzeig contacted Albert, who for years had turned down the other documentary filmmakers that approached her. He persuaded her of his seriousness about telling her story, and after showing her his film The Devil and Daniel Johnston, gained her cooperation. “Literally, I gave [Feuerzeig] the open book: everything,” she said. “I gave him every single diary, everything.” According to Feuerzeig, Albert “had even more self-documentation than Daniel Johnston; all of her childhood notebooks and all the writings through the years, videotapes, boxes and boxes of audio.” Working from Albert's archives, Feuerzeig spent eight days filming an in-depth interview with her, which he used as the spine of his feature-length documentary. “She shared everything one hundred percent honestly,” Feuerzeig insisted.

Author: The JT LeRoy Story premiered at the Sundance Film Festival on January 22, 2016, and then made the rounds of international film festivals; it was released nationwide to American theaters on September 9, 2016. Feuerzeig went on to receive a nomination for the Writers Guild of America Award for Best Documentary Screenplay at the 69th Writers Guild of America Awards.

=== Other projects ===
In 2009, Feuerzeig began production on a proposed feature documentary about artist Shepard Fairey, the lawsuit brought against him by the Associated Press and his Fair Use defense in creating the iconic Barack Obama "Hope" poster during the 2008 presidential election. To be called The Boy Who Cried Hope, the film was postponed indefinitely following revelations that Fairey had lied about the photographic source material for the poster.

In April 2011, Feuerzeig directed The Dude, an 18-minute documentary profile of Jeff “The Dude” Dowd, a long-time producer's rep for independent films and putative inspiration for the Coen Brothers’ The Big Lebowski. The short was broadcast on the USA Network as part of its “Character” series.

On 9 April 2013, called into The Best Show to discuss his "Piano Van" film project on the musician Chris Stroffolino.

=== Upcoming projects ===
Feuerzeig has completed the screenplay for God Bless Tiny Tim with filmmaker/playwright Julien Nitzberg. This portrait of the latterday crooner and accidental cultural icon is currently in development. He is also slated to direct The Bleeder, a biopic of boxer Chuck Wepner, whose life story inspired (and was in turn affected by) the Sylvester Stallone film Rocky. Feuerzeig co-wrote the script with Jerry Stahl, and the film is set to star Liev Schreiber as Wepner.

== Filmography ==
- Jon Hendricks: The Freddie Sessions (1990)
- Half Japanese: The Band That Would Be King (1994)
- The Devil and Daniel Johnston (2006)
- The Dude (2011)
- The Real Rocky (2011)
- Author: The JT LeRoy Story (2016)
- Chuck (2016) - Writer
