= Popular Trauma Culture =

2011 non-fiction book by Anne Rothe

Popular Trauma Culture: Selling the Pain of Others in the Mass Media is a nonfiction book by Anne Rothe published in 2011 by Rutgers University Press.

== Summary ==
In the book Rothe examines how trauma, and Holocaust discourse in particular, has come to function as a dominant cultural framework in American mass media. She argues that popular representations of the Holocaust, often organized around a melodramatic opposition between good and evil and centered on the figures of the victim-survivor and the perpetrator, have provided a template for how personal suffering is narrated in media and literature more broadly. Over time, this narrative structure becomes a general model through which trauma is represented, interpreted, and consumed in contemporary culture.

Rothe examines clichés in American Holocaust narratives, such as political appropriation, "victim talk" rhetoric, and the elevation of survivor identity — all of which become templates for interpreting and portraying suffering. She explores how daytime talk shows (e.g., The Oprah Winfrey Show) turn narratives of suffering into trauma kitsch — mass-mediated spectacles that commodify pain for entertainment. Shows like Jerry Springer exemplify what she calls "trauma camp", where personal trauma becomes sensationalized performance.

Rothe also provides one of the first scholarly analyses of misery memoirs — autobiographical or purportedly autobiographical books that recount extreme suffering, often sensationalized and sometimes fabricated. These works have become a massive commercial sector and reflect how audiences and publishers profit from consuming trauma narratives. She also discusses fake misery memoirs, showing how even inauthentic suffering narratives point to the cultural value placed on trauma stories. Rothe critiques how contemporary media and publishing turn personal pain into cultural capital — something consumed, marketed, and often distorted. This reflects deeper trends in American individualism and the mass media’s role in shaping notions of suffering and identity.

== Reception ==
Jan Taubitz finds Rothe's critique convincing, but also notes some repetition and argues that Rothe could have more fully explained how psychological framings produce depoliticization, identified who benefits from it, and engaged more deeply with counterexamples where victimhood becomes a basis for political action. Despite these limitations, he judges the book to be accessible, stimulating, and highly relevant to Holocaust studies, media studies, and broader cultural analysis.

In her critical review Karyn Ball takes issue with Rothe’s treatment of survivor testimony and narrative agency. According to Ball, in her argument that testimony contributes to trauma kitsch, Rothe discounts the complex narrative functions of testimony, memory, and identification, potentially minimizing the ethical and historical significance of survivor voices in trauma discourse.

In The New Past scientific journal O.A. Dzhumailo raises concerns that Rothe’s critique can verge on problematic characterizations of Holocaust studies and the "Holocaust industry." He suggests her framing, especially her emphasis on melodramatic victim/survivor narratives, may unintentionally echo controversial rhetoric found in critiques of Holocaust culture. Nevertheless, he writes: "Taking into account the growing interest of the humanities to the Holocaust, Rothe’s work is remarkable for its intellectual revision of American popular culture."

== See also ==
- Fake memoir
- Misery literature
- Oprah's Book Club
- Trauma culture
