= Catherine Liu =

American cultural theorist

- Born: 1964 (age 61–62); Taipei, Taiwan

Academic background
- Education: Yale University (BA); CUNY Graduate Center (PhD)
- Thesis: Reading Machines: Fiction, Femininity, Automaton in Ancien Régime France (1994)

Academic work
- Institutions: University of California, Irvine

Catherine Liu (born 1964, Taipei, Taiwan) is an American cultural theorist and author whose areas of research include Sinophone cinema, French literature, critical theory, identity politics, and visual arts. She is known for her critique of the professional–managerial class.

== Education and career ==
Liu earned a B.A. from Yale College and a Ph.D. from CUNY Graduate Center. She taught previously at the University of Minnesota, Twin Cities and Bard College before accepting a position at the University of California, Irvine. Liu is professor in the Departments of Film and Media Studies/Visual Studies, Comparative Literature and English at the University of California, Irvine, where she also served as director of the UCI Humanities Center. As President of the Western Humanities Alliance, she edited a special issue of the Western Humanities Review (2016) on the topic of prestige. For several years she organized a project about urban history and planned communities.

== Research ==
Her research and teaching targets the intellectual history and formation of cultural criticism, the history of the professional-managerial class, psychoanalytic theory, the political economy of cultural revolutions, and the work of the Frankfurt School and Walter Benjamin. She has also published on various topics in art criticism, museum history, and cultural politics.

In 2000, she published Copying Machines: Taking Notes for the Automaton with the University of Minnesota Press. In 2011, she published The American Idyll: Academic Anti-Elitism as Cultural Critique with the University of Iowa Press which addresses the abuse of populist mistrust of elites and its relationship to anti-intellectualism in American cultural politics. Her 2021 book, Virtue Hoarders: The Case Against the Professional Managerial Class, is a polemical call to reject making a virtue out of taste and consumerism habits. She argues that the class stands in the way of social justice and economic redistribution by promoting meritocracy, philanthropy, and other self-serving operations as an individualist path to a better world. She is also co-editor of the 2007 book, The Dreams of Interpretation: A Century down the Royal Road, a reexamination of the legacy of Freud.

In 2026 her latest book, Traumatized: The New Politics of Public Suffering was published by Verso.

== Selected publications ==
- Liu, Catherine (2000). Copying Machines: Taking Notes for the Automaton. Minneapolis: University of Minnesota Press. ISBN 978-0-8166-9113-5. OCLC 191818094.
- Liu, Catherine (2011). American Idyll: Academic Anti-Elitism as Cultural Critique. Iowa City: University of Iowa Press. ISBN 978-1609380502. OCLC 712644571.
- Liu, Catherine (2012). Oriental Girls Desire Romance (second ed.). New York: Kaya Press. ISBN 978-1-885030-90-0. OCLC 698170951.
- Liu, Catherine (2021). Virtue Hoarders: The Case Against the Professional Managerial Class. Minneapolis: University of Minnesota Press. ISBN 978-1-4529-6645-8. OCLC 1235762749.
- Liu, Catherine (2026). Traumatized: The New Politics of Public Suffering. Verso Books. ISBN 9781804296745.

== See also ==
- Trauma culture
