= Stephen Beachy =

American writer (born 1965)

- Born: 1965 (age 60–61)
- Education: University of Iowa; Iowa Writers' Workshop
- Occupation: Writer
- Website: www.livingjelly.com

Stephen Beachy (born 1965) is an American writer.

== Early life ==
Beachy's parents are Mennonites and his paternal grandparents were Old Order Amish. Beachy is a second cousin of biologist Philip Beachy and historian Robert M. Beachy and also a relative of biologist Roger N. Beachy. He attended the University of Iowa from 1983 to 1990, both as an undergrad and in the Iowa Writers' Workshop. As a student he traveled extensively in the US and Latin America, sometimes by motorcycle and sometimes hitchhiking, which influenced his first novel.

== Writings ==
His first novel, The Whistling Song, with cover illustrations by Curt Kirkwood, was published in 1991, and his second novel, Distortion, in 2000. Two novellas, Some Phantom and No Time Flat, were published in 2006 and have been described as a cross between The Turn of the Screw and Herk Harvey's Carnival of Souls.

Robert Gluck said, "Stephen Beachy is a visionary. In these twin novellas, he explores madness and crime with the nocturnal lyricism of empty time and space." His novel boneyard, was published in 2011. It is a collaboration with a young Amish boy, Jake Yoder, whose existence is unconfirmed, and deals with the West Nickel Mines School shooting in Nickel Mines, PA.

Beachy has said his influences for that work include the Brothers Grimm, Agota Kristof, Kathy Acker, and the many multibiographies written by authors with multiple personality disorder. Beachy's fiction has also been published in BOMB, Chicago Review, Blithe House Quarterly, SHADE, and various anthologies.

His nonfiction publications include an essay God's Radar Screen in the anthology Love, Castro Street. He has written literary and film criticism for the San Francisco Bay Guardian. In October, 2005, he published an article in New York Magazine, exposing the writer JT LeRoy as the concoction of a woman named Laura Albert, with the help of her family members.

Beachy has been cited by scholar Daniel Shank Cruz as an important figure in Queer Mennonite literature.

== Teaching and Editing ==
From 1995 to 1996, he taught for WritersCorps in San Francisco. Since 1999 Beachy has taught in the MFA Program at the University of San Francisco. He is the Prose Editor of the literary journal Your Impossible Voice, which has featured the work of Jessica Hagedorn, Horacio Castellanos Moya, Stacey Levine, and Daniel Borzutzky, among others.

== Bibliography ==
- The Whistling Song (fiction, WW Norton, 1991)
- Distortion (fiction, Harrington Park Press, 2000; Rebel Satori Press, 2010)
- Some Phantom / No Time Flat (two novellas, Suspect Thoughts, 2006; Verse Chorus 2013)
- boneyard (fiction, Verse Chorus, 2011)
- Glory Hole (fiction, Fiction Collective Two, 2017)
