= Altamont School =

The Altamont School

Location
- 4801 Altamont Road; Birmingham, Alabama 35222; United States; 33°30′50″N 86°45′28″W

Information
- Type: Private
- Motto: Truth, Knowledge, Honor
- Established: 1975 (51 years ago)
- CEEB code: 010335
- Head of school: Cecil F. Stodghill, Jr.
- Teaching staff: 40.8 FTE (2021–22)
- Grades: 5–12
- Enrollment: 362 (2021–22)
- Student to teacher ratio: 8.9 (2021–22)
- Colors: Gold, white, and black
- Athletics: Basketball, Cross Country, Soccer, Tennis, Indoor Track, Outdoor Track and Field, Volleyball, Baseball, Golf, Robotics
- Mascot: Knight
- Yearbook: Altimissimus
- Website: altamontschool.org

The Altamont School, located in Birmingham, Alabama atop Red Mountain, is a college preparatory day school with coeducational enrollment of grades 5–12. Most of the students live in Birmingham and the surrounding communities.

== History ==
Altamont was established in 1975 as a merger between the Brooke Hill School, a college preparatory school for girls founded in 1940, and the Birmingham University School, a boys' school founded in 1922 by Basil M. Parks.

Cecil F. Stodghill, Jr. was named Head of School in 2022.

== Campus ==
Altamont's main campus is located on 28 acres (11 ha) on the crest of Red Mountain just south of downtown Birmingham. The main school building houses forty classrooms, two science wings, a fine arts center, a student center, an art gallery and sculpture garden, a computer lab, a 20,000-volume library, and special studios for chorus, art, photography, and orchestra. An audio-visual recording studio was recently added to the fine arts suite. The athletic facilities include two gymnasiums with two basketball courts, three volleyball courts and a weight room. The main campus offers six tennis courts, a soccer field and a track. A second campus provides another gymnasium as well as soccer, baseball, and softball fields.

== Students, faculty, and administration ==
Approximately 80% of Altamont graduates matriculate to out-of-state colleges and universities. A total of 14% of the students in the Class of 2008 were named National Merit semi-finalists, the highest percentage of a school in the state. The faculty consists of 54 teachers, of whom nearly three-quarters hold master's degrees or higher. Altamont is governed by a board of trustees. The school is accredited by the Southern Association of Colleges and Schools.

== Athletics ==
As of 2005 the girls track and cross country teams had won the state title for 14 years straight. Altamont boys track won the outdoor title in 2006 and the indoor in 2004 and 2005. The girls soccer team have won State Titles in 2004, 2006, and 2007. The boys team won in 2003, 2008, and 2012.

== Notable alumni ==
- William J. Cabaniss, former ambassador to the Czech Republic
- Rebecca Gilman, Evening Standard Award winning playwright and Pulitzer Prize finalist
- Kate Jackson, actress
- Diane McWhorter, Pulitzer Prize-winning author
- Wayne Rogers, actor
- Warren St. John, reporter for The New York Times, author of "Rammer Jammer Yellow Hammer"
- Margaret Tutwiler, former ambassador to Morocco and former undersecretary for Public Diplomacy and Public Affairs, U.S. State Department
- Daniel Wallace, author of Big Fish
- Harry Miree, Grammy-nominated musician
- Mary Badham, actress
