= Laura Albert =

American author

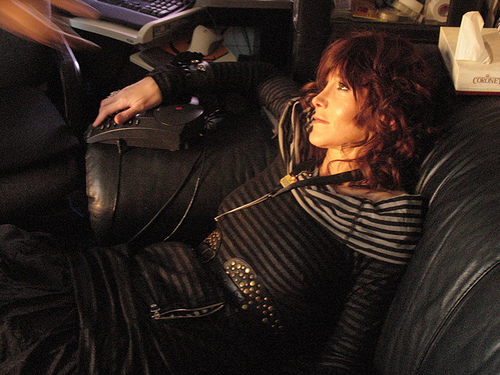
- Albert in her study, 2007
- Born: Laura Victoria Albert; November 2, 1965 (age 61); New York City, U.S.
- Occupation: Author
- Writing career
- Pen name: JT LeRoy; Emily Frasier; Speedie; Laura Victoria; Gluttenberg
- Years active: 1997–present
- Genre: Fiction

Laura Victoria Albert (born November 2, 1965) is an American author who invented the literary persona JT LeRoy, whom Albert described as an "avatar." She published various works of purportedly autobiographical fiction under the LeRoy name before being revealed as the true author. Albert has also used the aliases Emily Frasier and Speedie, and published other works as Laura Victoria and Gluttenberg. After the true authorship was revealed, Albert was sued for fraud for having signed a film-option contract as the fictitious LeRoy; a jury found against her. The damages to be paid to the film company were settled out of court.

== Early life ==
Albert grew up in Brooklyn Heights, the child of two educators who divorced when she was young. She left her mother's care as a teenager, spent time in a group home for troubled kids, and took fiction classes at the New School in Manhattan while taking part in the early-80s punk scene in the nearby East Village. She later moved to San Francisco and worked for several years as a phone sex operator and by reviewing sex sites and products on the Web, as well as writing erotica such as "Vicious Panties" and "Down." She achieved some degree of fame as a freelance sexpert, under the alias "Laura Victoria", using that name to write columns for Future Sex and later the Rolling Stone website.

As a teen, Albert would call suicide hotlines for help, sometimes speaking to the operators as though she were a young male. She said she felt more comfortable speaking with strangers as a boy because of past sexual abuse and claimed to find counselors to be sympathetic when she called as a male.

Albert continued making these calls into adulthood, sometimes posing as a young male from an unstable background nicknamed "Terminator." As Terminator, she began receiving treatment from Terrence Owens, a psychologist with the McAuley Adolescent Psychiatric Program at St. Mary's Medical Center in San Francisco. Owens, who conducted his sessions with Terminator/Albert exclusively over telephone and never met her in person, is credited with encouraging Terminator, who later became known as JT LeRoy, to write during their therapy sessions. Owens eventually gave some of this material to a neighbor of his who worked as an editor, who put LeRoy in contact with other figures in the San Francisco literary scene.

== Career as JT LeRoy ==
The character of Jeremiah "Terminator" (JT) LeRoy, as presented by Albert, was an underage, gay, male prostitute who started working in Appalachian truck stops while still a boy.

"Baby Doll", JT LeRoy's first published story, appeared under the byline "Terminator" in a September 1997 anthology. Albert published three books of fiction under the JT LeRoy pseudonym – Sarah (2000), The Heart Is Deceitful Above All Things (2001), and Harold's End (2004).

According to The New Republic, Sarah was the second book Albert wrote but the first one published. The narrator is an adolescent among a group of lot lizards (prostitutes at truck stops). The narrator aspires to move higher in the ranks of prostitutes like his mother, Sarah. The book is by JT LeRoy but LeRoy's character is never directly named, being referred to instead as 'Cherry Vanilla' or, more regularly, Sarah, after his mother. The novel is written in a magical style that contrasts with its narrator's gritty and unconventional lifestyle.

SF Weekly's literary critic described The Heart Is Deceitful Above All Things as "essentially the prequel to Sarah." "This novel is a collection of ten stories that describe a "chaotic, nomadic, and abuse-filled childhood." In the opening story, "Disappearances," a young boy named Jeremiah leaves a stable foster home to reunite with his biological mother, Sarah, an 18-year-old drug addict. The stories begin in Appalachia and follow the characters to California. Jeremiah's grandfather beats him while invoking judgmental Christian dogma. The abuse is the most consistent form of physical touch Jeremiah knows, and he comes to interpret it as a form of love.

=== Public appearances ===
To disguise LeRoy's true identity, Albert, when speaking as LeRoy, communicated exclusively via phone, fax, and email, citing LeRoy's overwhelming social anxiety as an excuse to avoid in-person meetings or public appearances. When meeting face-to-face, Albert would adopt the additional persona of Emily "Speedie" Frasier, a well-travelled woman with a Cockney accent who purported to be JT's friend and roommate. According to author Mary Gaitskill, at a dinner date in which she and LeRoy were to meet, Albert arrived, in the guise of Speedie instead of LeRoy, and the two engaged in a long conversation. "She struck me as very bright and very young," recalled Gaitskill.

In 2001, a person claiming to be LeRoy began appearing in public, usually decked out in wigs and sunglasses. This was later revealed to be Albert's sibling-in-law Savannah Knoop, whom Albert had enlisted to portray LeRoy in public. Knoop continued to appear as LeRoy for several years, often accompanied by Albert posing as Speedie/Emily Frasier.

A friend, Steve O'Connor, said that he knew Laura Albert had written the books. Star photographer Mary Ellen Mark claimed that when she photographed Savannah Knoop for a Vanity Fair shoot she was certain that Savannah Knoop was a woman and recalled the costumed JT LeRoy persona as "a masquerade that a lot of fancy people fell for...A put-on that didn't harm anybody."

=== Exposure ===
A 2005 New York Magazine article by Stephen Beachy called JT LeRoy's existence into question and implied that Laura Albert was the true author of the stories. The New York Times later confirmed that JT LeRoy was Albert's invention. Vanity Fair also publicly announced that Laura Albert wrote all of J.T.'s books, articles, and stories, corresponded as J.T. by e-mail, and spoke as him on the phone. Savannah Knoop stopped making public appearances as JT LeRoy and Laura Albert has not published under that name since.

Laura Albert explained the circumstances of JT's existence in a Fall 2006 Paris Review interview with Nathaniel Rich, attesting that she could not have written from raw emotion without the right to be presented to the world via JT LeRoy, whom she called her "phantom limb." She has also referred to JT LeRoy as "my shield" and compared him to "the mechanical hands that manipulate materials too dangerous to be touched directly." "I had survived sexual and physical abuse and found a way to turn it into art," she wrote in The Forward. "Having struggled with issues of gender fluidity when there was no language for it, I created a character both on and off the page who modeled this as yet to be named state of being."

Over the next decade, without the pseudonym, Albert gradually became more publicly expressive. Writing for The New York Times in 2016, Albert noted, "I meet a lot of young people and they're shocked that it was an issue to even have an avatar. Because they've grown up where you have multiple fully formed avatars."

=== Scholarly analysis of the hoax ===
Critics have discussed Albert's literary hoax in the context of the 1990s and early 2000s boom in misery literature, during which several works promoted as autobiographical were later exposed as fabricated. The genre capitalized on a cultural emphasis on public confessions of trauma and victimhood. Literary scholar Anne Rothe identifies LeRoy's books as emblematic of popular trauma culture and as child abuse narratives that falsely invited readers to interpret them as nonfiction. Although the books were marketed as fiction, Albert deliberately encouraged the belief that they were autobiographical by presenting LeRoy as a real person, thereby enhancing their appeal and commercial value. After the deception was revealed, Albert characterized her actions as the use of a pseudonym combined with performance art. Rothe argues, however, that a pseudonym traditionally conceals an author's identity so the work is judged on its own merits, rather than creating a fictional public persona. She further contends that Albert's use of an impersonator, signed contracts under the LeRoy name, and staged public appearances demonstrated an intentional effort to construct a false author identity to generate publicity and increase book sales.

=== Film option and lawsuit ===
Antidote International Films, Inc. and its president Jeffrey Levy-Hinte announced plans for a film adaptation of Sarah to be directed by Steven Shainberg. Albert signed a contract giving Antidote an option for the film rights to Sarah in the name of JT LeRoy. When Antidote discovered that JT LeRoy was a pseudonym of Albert, they requested to expand the project to include Albert's personal story calling it Sarahplus. She refused and they sued Albert for fraud, alleging that the option contract was void. Gregory Curtner, the lead lawyer for Antidote Films, said it was "the whole autobiographical back story aura that made this so attractive". A jury found against Albert and ordered her to pay Antidote the $110,000 she had received for the contract, as well as $6,500 in punitive damages. Albert was also ordered to pay $350,000 in legal fees to Antidote. In appealing the New York Federal Court's decision on August 13, 2008, the Authors Guild filed an Amicus Brief on her behalf that stated, “The right to free speech, and the right to speak and write anonymously are rights protected by our Constitution, and the district court's decision which holds that Laura Albert's use of pseudonym breached the Option and Purchase Agreement, is one that will have a chilling effect upon authors wishing to exercise their right to write anonymously.” Albert reached an out-of-court settlement with Antidote that allowed her to retain the copyright for her past and future works and gave Antidote payments based on Albert's future earnings.

== Later career ==
Albert wrote "Dreams of Levitation," Sharif Hamza's short film for NOWNESS, and worked as a writer for the television series Deadwood. The film Radiance, which she also wrote, was made an official selection of the 2015 Bokeh South African International Fashion Film Festival. She collaborated with director and playwright Robert Wilson for the international exhibition of his VOOM video portraits, and with the catalog for his "Frontiers: Visions of the Frontier" at Institut Valencià d'Art Modern (IVAM). In 2012 she served on the juries of the first Brasilia International Film Festival and the Sapporo International Short Film Festival; she also attended Brazil's international book fair, Bienal Brasil do Livro e da Leitura, where she and Alice Walker were the U.S. representatives. Brazil's Geração Editorial has re-released the JT LeRoy books in a box set under Laura Albert's name, and she and JT are the subjects of the hit Brazilian rock musical JT, Um Conto de Fadas Punk ("JT, A Punk Fairy Tale"). On March 11, 2014, the San Francisco Chronicle reported that the Academy of Friends Oscar Party in San Francisco invited JT LeRoy – played by gender-fluid fashion model Rain Dove – to walk the runway as part of its HIV/AIDS fundraiser.

In 2016, Laura Albert starred in a documentary about JT LeRoy that premiered at Sundance, titled Author: The JT LeRoy Story directed by Jeff Feuerzeig.

Albert has taught at Dave Eggers' 826 Valencia and the California College of the Arts in San Francisco, and has lectured with artist Jasmin Lim at Artists' Television Access with SF Camerawork's Chuck Mobley, in conjunction with a window installation about her work. A spokeswoman for the successful "Heart for Eye" campaign to raise funds for eye surgery for children, Albert hosted a television segment and was both an interviewee and an interviewer of inspirational women such as Anastasia Barbieri and Anh Duong. She was photographed by Steven Klein for QVEST magazine and by Kai Regan for his "Reckless Endangerment" at ALIFE; she has also done fashion shoots for Christian Lacroix and John Galliano. Albert profiled Juergen Teller for the 2003 Citibank Photography Prize catalogue; and published her reminiscence of Lou Reed in The Forward. She was a catalog contributor for the "Blind Cut" exhibition at New York's Marlborough Chelsea and collaborated with Williamsburg band Japanther, releasing a limited-edition cassette under the name True Love in a Large Room, with original artwork by Winston Smith. She has also written for dot429, the world's largest LGBTA professional network, and been an invited speaker at their annual conferences in New York; her talks and lectures about gender variance and transgender issues include dot429, Bomb Magazine, Ireland's Mindfield Literary Stage, and the Transgression Symposium at Utah Valley University. In January 2023, Albert spoke at the San Francisco Public Library with actor/photographer Brooke Smith, author of the book Sunday Matinee, about their involvement in the 1980s New York hardcore punk scene.

== In other media ==
Actress Laura Dern portrayed Albert in the 2018 biographical drama JT LeRoy, based on Savannah Knoop's memoir. The film was directed by Justin Kelly and co-starred Kristen Stewart as Knoop.

Documentaries about Albert include Author: The JT LeRoy Story (2016) directed by Jeff Feuerzeig, and The Cult of JT LeRoy (2015) directed by Marjorie Sturm.

As part of the artist and filmmaker Lynn Hershman Leeson’s 2014 exhibition "How To Disappear," she premiered her video The Ballad of JT LeRoy, examining Laura Albert's use of the literary persona JT LeRoy. Reflecting on the parallels between JT LeRoy and her own alter ego Roberta Breitmore, Hershman Leeson has commented:

The concept of an alter ego is not new at all. Writers have been protecting themselves in that way for centuries. Mary Shelley did it. Of course Laura took this practice further and I think that was very smart and I do not think she deserves the kind of condemnation that she got. If I had done the Roberta thing ten years later, I would have faced the same problems.
