= Orya (play) =

Comedy by Epicharmus

The Orya (literally meaning "The pork") is a Greek comedy written by Epicharmus in 500 BC, mentioned by Hesychius.
