= Phormis =

Phormis (Ancient Greek: Φόρμις; fl. c. 478 BC) is one of the originators of Greek comedy, or of a particular form of it. Aristotle identified him as one of the originators of comedy, along with Epicharmus of Kos. He was said to be the first to introduce actors with robes reaching to the ankles, and to ornament the stage with skins dyed purple—as drapery it may be presumed.

== Surviving Titles and Fragments ==
The Suda gave a list of his comedies:

- Admetus
- Alcinous
- Alcyone
- Atalante
- Cepheus (or Kephalaia)
- Hippos ("The Horse")
- Iliou Porthesis ("The Sacking of Troy")
- Perseus
