= Author: The JT LeRoy Story =

2016 American documentary film

- Directed by: Jeff Feuerzeig
- Written by: Jeff Feuerzeig
- Produced by: Jim Czarnecki; Danny Gabai; Brett Ratner; Molly Thompson
- Starring: Laura Albert
- Cinematography: Richard Henkels
- Edited by: Michelle M. Witten
- Music by: Walter Werzowa
- Production companies: A&E Indie films RatPac Documentary Films; Complex Corporation; Vice
- Distributed by: Amazon Studios; Magnolia Pictures
- Release dates: January 22, 2016 (Sundance Film Festival); September 9, 2016 (United States)
- Running time: 110 minutes
- Country: United States
- Language: English
- Box office: $96,604 (Worldwide)

Author: The JT LeRoy Story is a 2016 American documentary film about American writer Laura Albert and her literary persona JT LeRoy. It examines the critical acclaim given the JT LeRoy books and their international popularity, and the subsequent scandal when it was revealed that LeRoy did not exist and Albert had written the books. Jeff Feuerzeig, the film's writer/director, told Kevin Lally of Film Journal International, “I thought it was the wildest story about story I had ever heard,” and noted, “one voice glaringly missing from all these accounts [was] the voice of the author of the fiction on and off the page, Laura Albert. She had held her story back, and I said: Wow! That’s the voice I would like to hear.”

The film premiered at the Sundance Film Festival in 2016.

== Reception ==
=== Critical response ===
On Rotten Tomatoes the film has an approval rating of 77% based on 92 reviews. The site's critical consensus reads, "Author: The JT LeRoy Story serves as a worthy primer on its fascinating subject as well as an insightful look at the ever-evolving nature of modern celebrity." On Metacritic the film has a score of 72 out of 100, based on reviews from 24 critics.

== Awards and nominations ==
Year	Award	Category	Recipient(s)	Result	Ref.
2017	Cinema Eye Honors	The Unforgettables	Laura Albert	Won	
2017	Cinema Eye Honors	Outstanding Achievement in Graphic Design or Animation	Ana Gomez Bernaus, Syd Garon and Chris Kirk	Nominated	
2017	Writers Guild of America	Best Documentary Screenplay	Jeff Feuerzeig	Nominated	
2016	Sundance Film Festival	Grand Jury Prize: Documentary	Jeff Feuerzeig	Nominated	
2016	DocAviv	The International Competition	Jeff Feuerzeig	Nominated	
2016	Champs-Élysées Film Festival	Prix du jury	Jeff Feuerzeig	Nominated	
