= Epicharmus of Cos =

Late 6th/early 5th century BC Greek dramatist and philosopher

Epicharmus of Cos (variantly Epicharmus of Kos, Epicharmus Comicus or Epicharmus Comicus Syracusanus; Ancient Greek: Ἐπίχαρμος ὁ Κῷος), thought to have lived between c. 550 and c. 460 BC, was a Greek dramatist and philosopher who is often credited with being one of the first comedic writers, having originated the Doric or Sicilian comedic form.

== Literary evidence ==
Most of the information about Epicharmus comes from the writings of Athenaeus, Suda and Diogenes Laërtius, although fragments and comments come up in a host of other ancient authors as well. The standard edition of his fragments was made by Kaibel (1890) to which there has been various additions and emendments. There have also been some papyrus finds of longer sections of text, but these are often so full of holes that it is difficult to make sense of them. Plato mentions Epicharmus in his dialogue Gorgias and in Theaetetus. In the latter, Socrates refers to Epicharmus as "the prince of Comedy", Homer as "the prince of Tragedy", and both as "great masters of either kind of poetry". Aristotle (Poetics 5.1449b5) writes that he and Phormis invented comic plots (μῦθοι, muthoi).

The 12th-century philosopher Constantine of Nicaea cites Epicharmus.

== Life ==
All of his biographical information should be treated as suspect. Epicharmus' birthplace is not known, but late and fairly unreliable ancient commentators suggest a number of alternatives. The Suda (E 2766) records that he was either Syracusan by birth or from the Sikanian city of Krastos. Diogenes Laërtius (VIII 78) records that Epicharmus was born in Astypalea, the ancient capital of Kos on the Bay of Kamari, near modern-day Kefalos. Diogenes Laërtius also records that Epicharmus' father was the prominent physician Helothales, who moved the family to Megara in Sicily, when Epicharmus was just a few months old. Although raised according to the Asclepiad tradition of his father, as an adult Epicharmus became a follower of Pythagoras.

It is most likely that sometime after 484 BC, he lived in Syracuse, Magna Graecia, and worked as a poet for the tyrants Gelo and Hiero I. The subject matter of his poetry covered a broad range, from exhortations against intoxication and laziness to such unorthodox topics as mythological burlesque, but he also wrote on philosophy, medicine, natural science, linguistics, and ethics. Among many other philosophical and moral lessons, Epicharmus taught that the continuous exercise of virtue could overcome heredity, so that anyone had the potential to be a good person regardless of birth. He died in his 90s (according to a statement in Lucian, he died at ninety-seven).

Diogenes Laërtius records that there was a bronze statue dedicated to him in Syracuse, by the inhabitants, for which Theocritus composed the following inscription:

As the bright sun excels the other stars,
As the sea far exceeds the river streams:
So does sage Epicharmus men surpass,
Whom hospitable Syracuse has crowned.

Theocritus' Epigram 18 (AP IX 600; Kassel and Austin Test. 18) was written in his honour.

The cosmopolitan scientist and traveler Alexander von Humboldt turned Epicharmus into the protagonist of the only literary text he ever published; it appeared 1795 in Friedrich Schiller's journal Horen under the title "Die Lebenskraft oder der Rhodische Genius" [The Vital Force or the Rhodian Genius]. Epicharmos figures here as a natural philosopher and interpreter of art.

== Works ==
Epicharmus wrote between thirty-five and fifty-two comedies, though many have been lost or exist only in fragments. Along with his contemporary Phormis, he was alternately praised and denounced for ridiculing the great mythical heroes. At the time it would have been dangerous to present comedies in Syracuse like those of the Athenian stage, in which attacks were made upon the authorities. Accordingly, the comedies of Epicharmus are calculated not to give offence to the ruler. They are either mythological travesties or character comedies.

His two most famous works were Agrōstīnos ("The Country-Dweller," or "Clodhopper"), which dealt humorously with the rustic lifestyle, and Hebes Gamos ("The Marriage of Hebe"), in which Heracles was portrayed as a glutton. He also depicted Odysseus as an unheroic figure of burlesque by parodying the Homeric image for comic effect in his Odysseùs Autómolos (Ulysses the Deserter). Additional works include

- Alkyon
- Amykos ("Amycus")
- Harpagai
- Bakkhai
- Bousiris ("Busiris")
- Ga Kai Thalassa ("Earth and Sea")
- Deukalion ("Deucalion")
- Dionysoi ("The Dionysuses")
- Diphilus
- Elpis ("Hope"), or Ploutos ("Wealth")
- Heorta kai Nasoi
- Epinikios
- Herakleitos ("Heraclitus")
- Thearoi ("Spectators")
- Hephaistos ("Hephaestus"), or Komastai ("The Revelers")
- Kyklops ("The Cyclops")
- Logos kai Logeina
- Megaris ("Woman From Megara")
- Menes ("Months")
- Odysseus Nauagos ("Odysseus Shipwrecked")
- Orya ("The Sausage")
- Periallos
- Persai ("The Persians")
- Pithon ("The Little Ape" or "Monkey")
- Seirenes ("Sirens")
- Skiron
- Sphinx
- Triakades
- Troes ("Trojan Men")
- Philoktetes ("Philoctetes")
- Choreuontes ("The Dancers")
- Chytrai ("The Pots")

Reproducing a mid-4th century BC accusation from Alcimus, Diogenes Laërtius in his Lives of Eminent Philosophers conserves a late opinion that Plato plagiarized several of Epicharmus's ideas. "[H]e [Plato] derived great assistance from Epicharmus the Comic poet, for he transcribed a great deal from him, as Alcimus says in the essays dedicated to Amyntas [of Heraclea]...." Laërtius then lists, in III, 10, the several ways that Plato "employs the words of Epicharmus." There were also some works believed by the ancients to have been spuriously attributed to him, but actually written by the forger Axiopistus.

== Quotations ==
The translations below are from Kathleen Freeman's Ancilla to the Pre-Socratic Philosophers, which contains English translations of the 65 Epicharmus fragments included in Diels' Fragmente der Vorsokratiker.

- "Then what is the nature of men? Blown up bladders!" DK23 10
- "The best thing a man can have, in my view, is health." DK23 19
- "A mortal should think mortal thoughts, not immortal thoughts." DK23 20
- "The hand washes the hand: give something and you may get something." DK23 30
