= The English Mercurie =

Literary hoax

The English Mercurie is a literary hoax purporting to be the first English newspaper. It is apparently an account of the English battle with the Spanish Armada of 1588, but was in fact written by the second Earl of Hardwicke, Philip Yorke, in the 18th century as a literary game with some friends. Although the hoax was exposed in 1839, copies of the Mercurie are still mistakenly referred to as factual accounts in the modern era.

== The contents of the English Mercurie ==
With its gothic nameplate, faded typeface and Early Modern English spelling, The English Mercurie has many of the hallmarks of an early English newsbook. It contains the dateline of "Whitehall, July 23d, 1588", and the claim that it is "published by AUTHORITIE", "For the Prevention of false Reportes".

The four pages start with the spotting of the Spanish Armada by a Captain Fleming near Plymouth, and go on to describe the actions of Sir Francis Drake and Rear Admirals "Hawkins" (a reference to Sir John Hawkins) and "Forbisher" (a misspelling of Sir Martin Frobisher).

The newsbook gives a vivid account of the Spanish fleet's actions, saying

But about one in the Afternoone, they came in Sighte of the Spanish Armado two Leagues to the Westward of the Eddistone, sailing in the Form of a half-Moon, the Points whereof were seven Leagues asunder.

The Mercurie estimates the size of the Spanish fleet at 150 ships, and provides information about ships captured by the English fleet.

The second section carries the dateline of Ostend, 27 July, which contains a report of the organisation of the Spanish invasion force that was to follow the Armada, with "thirty thousand Foote and eighteen hundred Horse".

The newsbook then closes with a third report, dated London, 23 July, and describes how Queen Elizabeth I held an audience with dignitaries from the city of London, including the "Lord Mayor, Aldermen, Common-Council and Lieutenancie".

== History of the hoax ==
=== Hardwicke's literary game ===
The orchestrator of the hoax was Philip Yorke, 2nd Earl of Hardwicke, along with his friend Dr Thomas Birch, and possibly Yorke's brother Charles. They produced five issues of which three were printed and two were manuscript newsletters. Dr Birch bequeathed the manuscript and printed copies of the English Mercurie to the British Museum in 1766, without any explanation of their origin.

=== Acceptance as historical fact ===
The English Mercurie was referred to by George Chalmers, a Scottish antiquarian and political writer, in his 1794 book The Life of Thomas Ruddiman It predated the Mercurius Gallobelgicus which is widely accepted in studies of the history of journalism to be the true first newspaper which was written in Latin and appeared in 1594 in Cologne, Germany, and distributed across Europe. Chalmers adduced the Mercurie as evidence of English invention, saying

It may gratify our national pride to be told, that mankind are indebted to the wisdom of Elizabeth, and the prudence of Burleigh, for the first newspaper.

=== The uncovering of the hoax ===
Chalmers's assertion was unchallenged for 45 years until Thomas Watts uncovered the existence of the original manuscript in the archives of the British Museum in 1839. He identified the handwriting on the manuscript as being identical to that used in a letter from Yorke as part of Dr Birch's collection.

There were other inconsistencies, including the typeface and some spellings and Watts also found corrections on the manuscript in Dr Birch's handwriting The motivation of the authors in creating the English Mercurie is unknown, although it has been speculated that it was not an intentional attempt to mislead, but rather a literary game.

=== Modern uses of the English Mercurie ===
British television network Channel 4 contained a reference to The English Mercurie as "a newspaper report of Drake's role in the Spanish Armada" in a website for its series Elizabeth's Pirates.

The National Library of Australia includes The English Mercurie in its catalogue, among other apparently genuine historical documents from the Tudor and Stuart periods.

== See also ==
- History of journalism
