= Axiopistus =

Ancient Greek forger of the 4th century BCE

Axiopistus (Ancient Greek: Ἀξιόπιςτος) was a Locrian or Sicyonian, who was, according to the historian Philochorus, the true author of poems titled Canon and Maxims (Κανών, and Γνῶμαι), literary forgeries that Axiopistus attributed to Epicharmus of Kos.

Modern scholars believe Axiopistus created the poem by cobbling together a number of extracts of Epicharmus and other sources, so the work does contain some genuine works of Epicharmus, but also work spuriously attributed to him.

It is believed he lived in the 4th century BCE, and may have been part of the social circle of philosopher Heraclides Ponticus.
