= Savannah Knoop =

American filmmaker

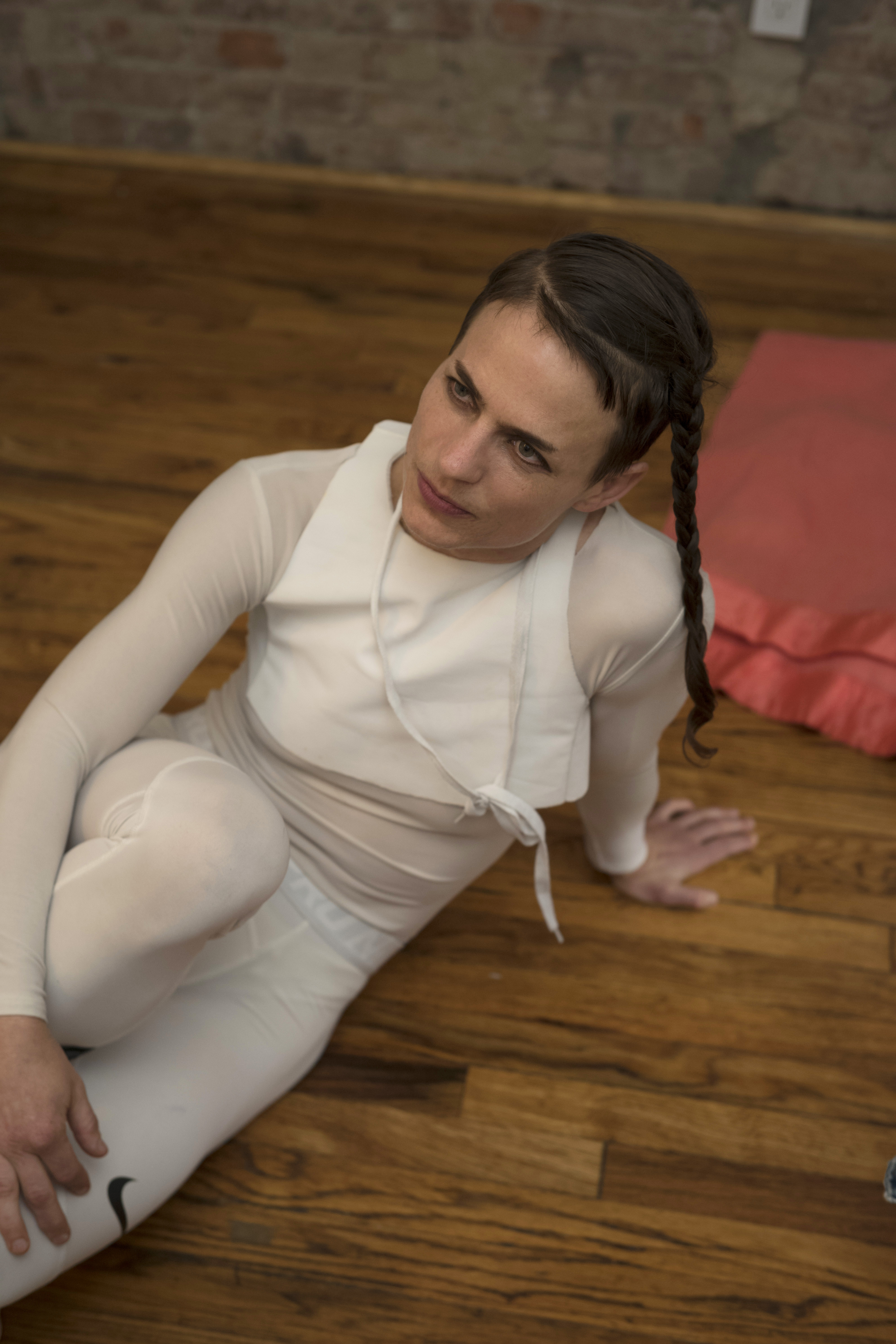
- Savannah Knoop
- Born: 1981 (age 44–45); San Francisco, California, United States
- Education: Virginia Commonwealth University
- Known for: Sculpture, film, writing

Savannah Knoop (born 1981) is an American artist and filmmaker. From 1999 to 2005, they (Note: Knoop identifies as gender neutral and uses they/them pronouns.) performed the public role of literary hoax JT Leroy.

== Early life ==
Knoop grew up in the San Francisco Bay area, born to artist and acupuncturist Sharon Hennessey, and documentary filmmaker and cinematographer, John Knoop. Knoop was the youngest of five half siblings. Knoop attended high school at Westover, an all girls boarding school in Connecticut. From 1999 to 2001, they attended City College of San Francisco.

== Portrayal of JT LeRoy ==
In 1999 writer Laura Albert, then-partner of Knoop's brother, asked Knoop to play her fictional persona JT LeRoy. Knoop embodied JT LeRoy in all public appearances for the next six years. After the literary scandal was unveiled in the NY Times in 2005, Seven Stories Press published Knoop's memoir in 2007 titled Girl Boy Girl: How I Became JT LeRoy cataloguing their experiences of playing their sister-in-law's writing persona and avatar JT LeRoy. With director Justin Kelly, they adapted it into the feature-length film JT Leroy, starring Kristen Stewart, Laura Dern, Jim Sturgess, and Diane Kruger, released by Universal Pictures in April 2019.

== Career ==
In 2001, Knoop founded the clothing line Tinc with Parachati Pattajotti, creative partner, architect and restaurateur. In 2006, their sister Hennessey Knoop joined as head of sales for their company. Tinc ran until 2009 and sold to stores such as Modern Appealing Clothing and Takashimaya. After folding Tinc, Knoop moved to New York. They finished their bachelor's degree in the fall of 2013 at CUNY Baccalaureate for Unique and Interdisciplinary Studies under the mentorship of Vito Acconci. In 2014 they went on to their MFA at Virginia Commonwealth University: Sculpture + Extended Media. Movement is an essential part of Knoop's practice. They have studied dance and martial arts for over twenty years. Knoop studies Brazilian jiu-jitsu under the tutelage of Marcelo Garcia in New York.

Knoop, who identifies as gender neutral, has shown and performed at the Whitney, MoMA, the ICA Philadelphia, the Leslie-Lohman Museum, Movement Research, and Essex Flowers gallery. They have collaborated and performed live with artists such as Simone Forti, A.K. Burns, Math Bass and Lauren Davis Fisher, Gordon Hall, Geo Wyeth, Nica Ross, Nicole Killian, Jules Gimbrone, Niv Acosta, Elizabeth Orr, Robert Wilson, and Laura Albert. From 2010 to 2016 they threw the party, WOAHMONE, with Nica Ross and Nathann Carerra.

== Selected works ==
- Tripod Sweep (2019)
- SCREENS, a project about "community" (2019)
- Nosferatu on the Beach (2018)
- Heads and Tails (2016)

== Collaborations ==
- Small Town Sex Shop (2015)
- WOAHMONE (2009-2016)
