= Shout NY =

- Publisher: D & G Publishing Corp.
- Founded: 1991
- Final issue: 2003
- Country: USA
- Based in: New York City
- Language: English
- ISSN: 1540-8507

Shout NY was a thought and culture magazine that covered New York arts, music, film and politics from 1991 through 2003. In its early days, it was fairly obscure and predominantly focused on New York City nightlife. Re-launched in 2000, it developed a cult following as one of a few periodicals of record for the burgeoning scene on the Lower East Side of Manhattan and the western neighborhoods of Brooklyn, including Williamsburg and Greenpoint. It published work by rising stars JT LeRoy, Jerry Stahl, Emma Forrest, Jonathan Lethem, Gary Shteyngart, Mark Kostabi, and Reverend Jen, and was featured in the 2001 edition of the Best American Non-Required Reading series. Future Gawker editor Jesse Oxfeld was also an early contributor. Shout NY was the first magazine to feature the band The Strokes on the cover and was an early promoter of New York staples like the Yeah Yeah Yeahs and The Rapture. The publisher was D & G Publishing Corp. The magazine hosted frequent popular parties in Manhattan and Brooklyn, before it closed its doors in early 2003.
