= The Heart Is Deceitful Above All Things (novel) =

2001 short story collection by JT LeRoy (Laura Albert)

- Author: JT LeRoy
- Language: English
- Genre: Short stories
- Publisher: Bloomsbury
- Publication date: 9 June 2001
- Publication place: United States
- Media type: Hardback and paperback
- Pages: 224 pp
- ISBN: 1-58234-142-7
- OCLC: 45879901
- Dewey Decimal: 813/.6 21
- LC Class: PS3562.E773 H4 2001
- Preceded by: Sarah

The Heart Is Deceitful Above All Things is a novel-like book of ten related short stories written by Laura Albert under the name JT LeRoy, a persona that she has described as an "avatar," asserting that it enabled her to write things that she was incapable of expressing as Laura Albert. These stories predate the 2000 JT LeRoy novel Sarah but were published in 2001, after Sarah was released. The title is taken from Jeremiah 17:9 (King James Bible version).

== Plot summary ==
The stories are narrated by the boy Jeremiah, who at the age of four is taken away from his foster parents, the only family he's known. He is reclaimed by his mother Sarah, who had given birth to him as an adolescent but was compelled to turn him over to foster care. Profoundly disturbed from her own life of abuse and poverty, Sarah takes him on the road with her, moving through aimless and dangerous encounters with a series of men, some of whom beat and rape Jeremiah. She frequently instructs her son to pretend to be her sibling—sometimes her brother, sometimes her sister. She is also abusive to him and abandons him repeatedly.

The child welfare system sends Jeremiah to live with Sarah's parents, religious fanatics who abuse him as relentlessly as they had abused her. Sarah finds him and takes him away with her, but her life continues to spiral out of control. She becomes a lot lizard (a prostitute who works the truck stops) and eventually slides into a paranoid breakdown from crystal meth abuse. Jeremiah is last seen as a 15-year-old street hustler in San Francisco, paying for a gay S&M session where he relives the beatings he had submitted to as a child.

The Heart Is Deceitful Above All Things employs narrative elements and characterizations that also occur in Sarah, although it avoids the picaresque and fable-like qualities of the latter novel. Its stories are more violent, their situations more disturbing; but in Jeremiah's attempts to comprehend and redefine his mistreatment, the book shares Sarah's poetic language and sometimes fluid treatment of time. These JT LeRoy books, along with the novella Harold's End (2004), deal with themes of abandonment, betrayal, abuse, exploitation, and loss – the loss of identity and gender, as well as material and emotional loss. They also utilize the narrative device of having one's hidden life revealed to the judgment and violence of others: The young Jeremiah shoplifts (on instruction of his mother) and is caught and beaten by the storeowner – a suffering and humiliation that recurs in his wanderings with Sarah as they struggle to feed themselves.

== Adaptations ==
The book was adapted into the 2004 feature film of the same name by director/co-writer Asia Argento, who also starred as Sarah. Jeremiah was played by Jimmy Bennett and by Dylan and Cole Sprouse.

In 2021 Blackstone Audio released an audiobook of The Heart Is Deceitful Above All Things along with eleven additional JT LeRoy stories. Filmmaker Jeff Feuerzeig read his foreword to the book's 2016 reissue by HarperCollins, and the stories were read by Christelle de Castro, Donovan Leitch, Laura Desiree, Kerris Dorsey, Julie Mintz, Winsome Brown, Michael Imperioli, Libby Mintz, Joshua Caleb Johnson, Darnell Martin, Laura Albert (as JT LeRoy), Lawrence Rothman, Paul Mendez, Pamela Sneed, Shirley Manson, Laila Hayani, Soko, Alissa Bennett, Daniel Newman, and Robin Weigert.

== See also ==
- Misery literature
