= JT LeRoy =

Literary persona adopted by writer Laura Albert

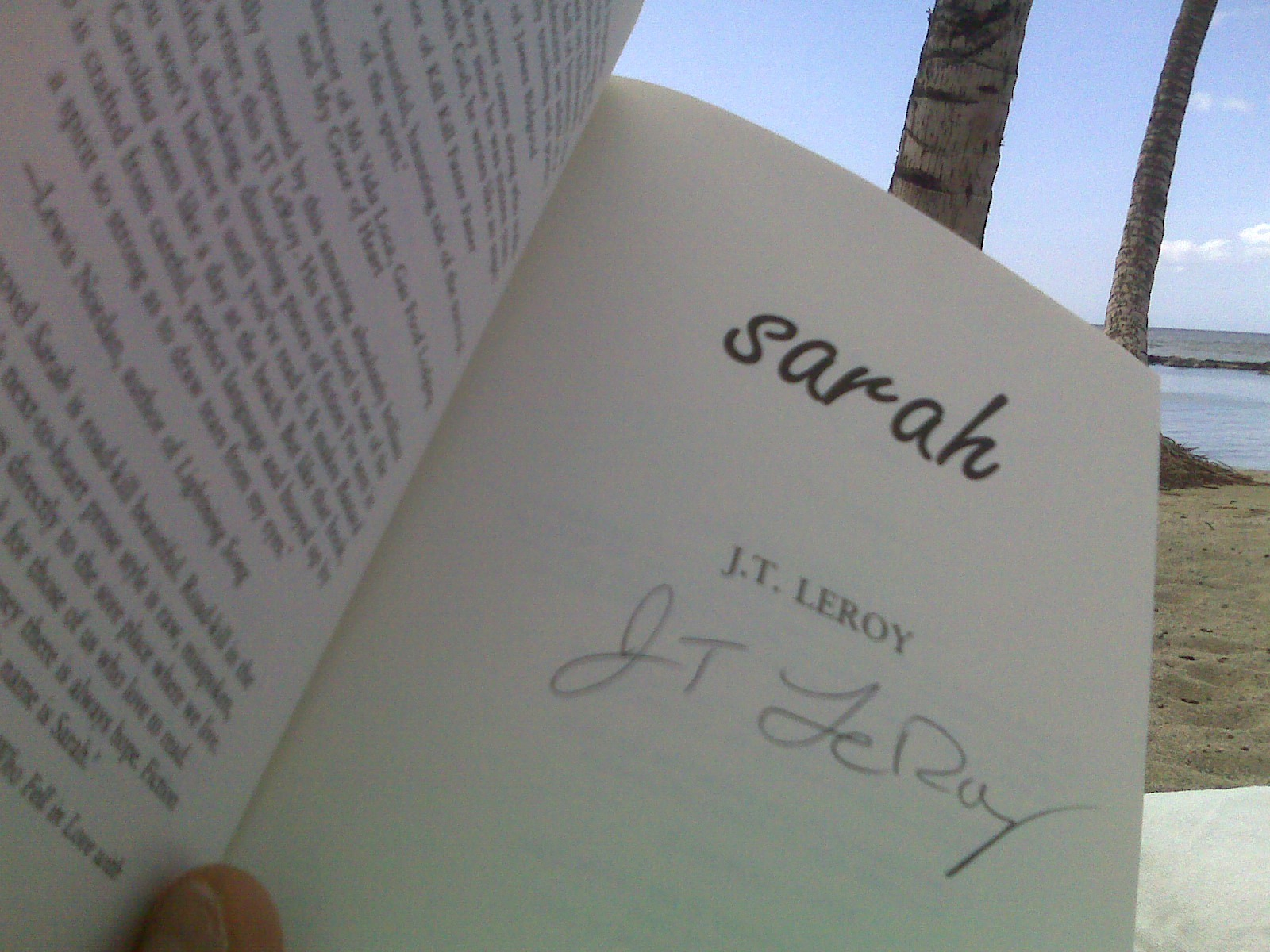
Sarah signed by "JT LeRoy"

Jeremiah Terminator LeRoy, or simply JT LeRoy, is a literary persona created in the 1990s by American writer Laura Albert. LeRoy was presented as the author of three books of fiction, which were purportedly semi-autobiographical accounts by a teenage boy of his experiences of poverty, drug use, and emotional and sexual abuse in his childhood and adolescence from rural West Virginia to California. Albert wrote these works, and communicated with people in the persona of LeRoy via phone and e-mail. Following the release of the first novel Sarah, Albert's sibling-in-law Savannah Knoop began to make public appearances as the supposed writer. The works attracted considerable literary and celebrity attention, and the authenticity of LeRoy has been a subject of debate, even as details of the creation came to light in the 2000s.

== Published works ==
Albert originally published as Terminator and later JT LeRoy.

- Sarah (2000)

By turns magical and realistic, the novel Sarah is narrated by a nameless boy whose mother Sarah is a lot lizard: a prostitute who works the truck stops in West Virginia. She can be abusive and abandoning, yet he longs for her love and tries to follow in her world, working for a pimp who specializes in "boy-girls".

- The Heart Is Deceitful Above All Things (2001)

Ten short stories that form a novel about the childhood of LeRoy, torn from his foster parents at age four when his emotionally disturbed mother reclaims him and then runs away with him. She alternately clings to LeRoy and abandons him, subjecting him to patterns of abuse and exploitation she has suffered throughout her life.

- Harold's End (2005)

The novella follows a young heroin addict who is befriended by Larry, an older man, from whom he receives an unusual pet. Illustrations are by Australian artist Cherry Hood. Published by Last Gasp.

=== Contributions to other written works ===
Work credited to LeRoy was published in literary journals such as Francis Ford Coppola's Zoetrope: All-Story, McSweeney's Quarterly Concern, Memorious, and Oxford American magazine's Seventh Annual Music Issue. LeRoy was listed as a contributing editor to BlackBook magazine, i-D and 7x7 magazines, and is credited with writing reviews, articles, and interviews for The New York Times, The Times of London, Spin, Film Comment, Filmmaker, Flaunt, Shout NY, Index Magazine, Interview, and Vogue, among others.

LeRoy's work has also appeared in such anthologies as The Best American Nonrequired Reading 2003, MTV's Lit Riffs, XXX: 30 Porn-Star Portraits, Nadav Kander's Beauty's Nothing, and The Fourth Sex: Adolescent Extremes. LeRoy is also listed as guest editor for Da Capo's Best Music Writing 2005.

Additionally, LeRoy was credited with liner notes and biographies for musicians Billy Corgan, Liz Phair, Conor Oberst, Ash, Bryan Adams, Marilyn Manson, Nancy Sinatra and Courtney Love and profiled award-winner Juergen Teller.

== Circumstances of LeRoy's creation ==
Calling a suicide hotline in the 1990s, Albert reached Dr. Terrence Owens, a psychologist with the McAuley Adolescent Psychiatric Program at St. Mary's Medical Center in San Francisco. Owens did not know her as Laura Albert at the time, but as "Jeremiah" or "Terminator". Owens is credited with encouraging "Jeremiah" or "Terminator" to write during their phone therapy sessions. Albert also recorded conversations without Owens' consent, and these illegally recorded phone calls made their way into the 2016 documentary Author: The JT LeRoy Story.

Albert explained the circumstances of LeRoy's existence in a 2006 interview in The Paris Review with Nathaniel Rich; she described her troubled history and her alleged personal experiences with abuse, abandonment, sex work, gender identity, and her need, since childhood, to create alternate personae (chiefly over the telephone) as a psychological survival mechanism, through which she could articulate her own ideas and feelings.

At her 2007 fraud trial, Albert described LeRoy as her "veil".

== Exposure ==
Throughout the 1990s, virtually no one had ever glimpsed the reclusive author. Then, in 2001, a person wearing a wig and sunglasses began appearing in public, claiming to be LeRoy.

In August 2005, journalist John Nova Lomax published the article "Coal Miner Mother of a Mess" in the Houston Press, casting doubt on the particulars of LeRoy's story. Lomax recounted his frustrated attempts to contact LeRoy by e-mail, pointed out several obvious discrepancies of fact, and cast doubt on LeRoy's existence. A few months later, Stephen Beachy, in an October 2005 article in New York magazine, revealed that LeRoy was indeed a fictional creation, invented by writer Laura Albert, and that LeRoy's purported public appearances in wig and sunglasses were made by an actor. Beachy asserted that Albert had been posing as LeRoy's caretaker and spokesperson, calling herself "Speedie", under the false premise that LeRoy lived with Albert and her husband Geoffrey Knoop, who used the pseudonym "Astor".

In January 2006, journalist Warren St. John revealed his finding in The New York Times that the person posing as LeRoy in a wig and sunglasses for six years was 25-year-old Savannah Knoop, Geoffrey Knoop's sibling. In a subsequent article, St. John published details of an interview with Geoffrey Knoop, in which Knoop confirmed that LeRoy did not exist, and that his sibling was LeRoy's public face. Knoop also admitted to St. John that Laura Albert had written the works published as LeRoy's.

In 2008, Savannah Knoop published a memoir, Girl Boy Girl: How I Became JT LeRoy, about their six-year career as an impersonator.

== Film option and lawsuit ==
Antidote International Films, Inc., and its president Jeffrey Levy-Hinte announced plans for a film adaptation of Sarah to be directed by Steven Shainberg. According to The New York Times, when Shainberg "learned who had truly written Sarah an inspiration came to him to make a 'meta-film', a triple-layered movie that would blend the novel with the lives of its real and purported authors in a project he took to calling Sarah Plus." The New York Times also reported that this new project "required the rights to Laura Albert's story, rights that she in no uncertain terms refused to grant".

In June 2007 Antidote sued Laura Albert for fraud, claiming that a contract signed by Albert in LeRoy's name to make a feature film of Sarah was null and void. A jury found against Albert in the sum of $116,500, holding that the use of the pseudonym to sign the film rights contract was fraudulent.

== In art and popular culture ==
Armistead Maupin's 2000 novel The Night Listener features the case of Anthony Godby Johnson, which is similar to that of LeRoy.

In 2013 filmmaker Michael Arias claimed LeRoy for his inspiration in translating Taiyo Matsumoto's manga Sunny.

At a 2013 symposium with filmmaker J. J. Abrams and Doug Dorst in New York, actress and writer Lena Dunham said that LeRoy "co-opted my imagination for a full year of my life. [...] It was pretty remarkable. And then you also go, 'This person isn't who they claim to be, but they still wrote this book that captured all of our imaginations, so then why does the identity of the author even matter when you're reading fiction and engaging with it in a really personal way?'" That same year, Laura Albert told Interview, "You know, JT LeRoy does not exist. But he lives. That's what a famous film historian once said about Bugs Bunny."

In 2014 interviewer Dylan Samson on the LastLook App blog stated that "Albert had ingeniously hacked the literary establishment".

In March 2014 the San Francisco Chronicle reported that the Academy of Friends Oscar Party in San Francisco invited JT LeRoy – played by gender fluid fashion model Rain Dove Dubilewski – to walk the runway as part of its HIV/AIDS fundraiser.

As part of the artist and filmmaker Lynn Hershman Leeson’s 2014 exhibition "How To Disappear," she premiered her video The Ballad of JT LeRoy, examining Laura Albert's use of the literary persona JT LeRoy. Reflecting on the parallels between JT LeRoy and her own alter ego Roberta Breitmore, Hershman Leeson has commented:

The concept of an alter ego is not new at all. Writers have been protecting themselves in that way for centuries. Mary Shelley did it. Of course Laura took this practice further and I think that was very smart and I do not think she deserves the kind of condemnation that she got. If I had done the Roberta thing ten years later, I would have faced the same problems.

The story of JT LeRoy was the subject of a 2018 feature film based on Savannah Knoop's memoir. Directed by Justin Kelly, the film starred Laura Dern as Laura Albert and Kristen Stewart as Knoop.

Documentaries about LeRoy include Author: The JT LeRoy Story (2016) directed by Jeff Feuerzeig, and The Cult of JT LeRoy (2015) directed by Marjorie Sturm.

== See also ==
- Misery literature
- Fake memoir
- James Frey
- Dave Pelzer
- Anthony Godby Johnson
- Beatrice Sparks
