= Alcimus (rhetorician) =

3rd-century BC Greek writer

Alcimus (Ancient Greek: Ἄλκιμος) was a Greek rhetorician who flourished around 300 BC. He was called by Diogenes Laërtius the most distinguished of all Greek rhetoricians. It is not certain whether he is the same as the Alcimus to whom Diogenes in another passage ascribes a work called Pros Amuntan (πρὸς Ἀμύνταν). Athenaeus in several places speaks of a Sicilian Alcimus, who appears to have been the author of a great historical work, parts of which are referred to under the names of Italica (Ἰταλικὰ) and Sicelica (Σικελικά). But whether he was the same as the rhetorician Alcimus, cannot be determined.
