= Rain Dove =

American model, actor, and activist

- Born: September 27, 1989 (age 36); Vermont, United States
- Modeling information
- Height: 6 ft 1 in (185 cm)
- Hair color: Brown
- Eye color: Brown
- Agencies: Major New York; Profile

Rain Dove Victoria Dubilewski (born September 27, 1989) is an American model, actor, and activist, best known for their work in fashion as a gender-nonconforming model, posing alternately as male and female in photoshoots, productions, and runway shows. Dove was voted as SheWired's Most Eligible Bachelorette in 2014 and named one of Elle Magazine's 12 Women Who Are Redefining Beauty in 2015.

A self-described "gender capitalist" non-binary person, Dove has written, "I've never really cared about pronouns for my own descriptors", and that they disavow personal pronouns and ask people to choose whichever they feel apply: "Use she, he, it, one, they ... I honestly don't care ... All I'm listening for in that sound is positivity."

== Early life and education ==
Assigned female at birth, Dove spent their early years believing they were ugly: they had a larger physique than other children and youth, and were given the nickname "Tranny Danny". Initially, Dove claimed in interviews and biographies to have studied genetic engineering and civil law at University of California, Berkeley. They also claimed to have worked as a Colorado Firefighter under a male pseudonym, and to have passed as a man during this time, for a period of eleven months. However, in late 2019 Dove admitted in a video on NBC News that both of these claims (of having studied genetics and law, and of having been a firefighter) were false.

== Modeling career ==
Dove began a modeling career after being challenged by a friend to present themselves as a man in a Calvin Klein casting for underwear. At the casting, they were handed the outfit for the test shoot, which was just a pair of underwear. When Dove came in topless, the designer responded by giving them a men's shirt and saying "Swear to God, you will not tell anyone you're a woman!" After the show, people began seeking Dove for modeling jobs; three months later they accepted their first modeling job and have since walked at New York fashion week on both men's and women's runways.

== Activism ==
During their final year in high school, Dove intentionally became homeless as a social experiment to "document how homelessness affected my academics". After this, Dove became more involved in activism and politics, and said they became interested in working for the United Nations prior to finding a career in fashion: "I wanted to work for the U.N. (United Nations) ... I would have applied at the U.N. and would have probably been working in some third world country, or a country that has water rights issues. Gender would be the least of my worries."

Dove supported the movement against North Carolina's HB2, which legislated that individuals had to use the restrooms corresponding with the sex listed on their birth certificates. In 2018, Dove said they were pepper-sprayed in a women's restroom in North Carolina by a woman who thought Dove was a man.

Regarding the fashion industry and gender issues, Dove states that advertising agencies "aren't some evil illuminati trying to dupe the people into living heteronormative white lifestyles" and that they are simply "trying to make money in the safest way possible." For example, Dove says of Queer Fashion Week, "When you have an event like this, you are telling the large conglomerates like Gap, Levi's, H & M etcetera that there is money to be made and there is a desire to represent the queer community in the commercial side of the fashion world. They don't have to be afraid to align themselves with the LGBTQ community."

A new clothing line by the name Phluid Project caught Dove's attention and got their support for being the first major non-binary clothing store in New York, and they participated in a panel as moderator.

During the 2022 Russian invasion of Ukraine, Dove led an effort to get transgender and other vulnerable people out of the country.

In 2024 during the Gaza war, Dove founded the grassroots initiative Safebow Gazan Aid, which they co-direct with Egypt-based American Arielle El-Bagory, to evacuate "exceptionally vulnerable" Palestinians to Egypt and provide refugees with basic needs assistance.

== Personal life ==
Dove dated actress Rose McGowan in 2018, but the couple split up after Dove sold TMZ texts in which Asia Argento, a friend of McGowan's, seemingly admits to sexually assaulting Jimmy Bennett.

Dove describes themself as a "gender capitalist", explaining, "Gender Capitalism is both Feminist and Masculinist. It's everythingist. It's the recognition that I, as an organism, am treated differently based on my perceived genitalia and the identity surrounding that relationship." They have also said, "You can identify with whatever you want. It's just that you recognise how society sees gender and you capitalise on it." In their work, this means using acting skills like changes in posture, gait and voice to strategically appear more femme or masculine at different times, both to "subvert expectations" of both gender expressions, and to "maximise opportunity and earnings".

== See also ==
- Leslie Feinberg – Pioneering author in the field of gender studies who expressed some similar attitudes around shifting pronouns in differing social settings
- LGBTQ culture in New York City
- List of LGBTQ people from New York City
