= Trauma culture =

Contemporary cultural framework

Trauma culture refers to a contemporary cultural framework in which psychological trauma is widely used as a primary lens for interpreting personal experience, social identity, and cultural production. The term is commonly used in media studies, literary criticism, sociology, and psychology to describe the increasing prominence of trauma narratives in popular media, publishing, and everyday discourse, particularly in Western societies since the late 20th century.

Trauma culture is associated with the expansion of clinical trauma concepts into everyday language, the commodification of suffering, and debates about authenticity, victimhood, and the ethics of representing pain.

Scholars and commentators differ in their assessments of trauma culture. Some emphasize its role in increasing awareness of psychological harm and legitimizing previously marginalized experiences, while others argue that trauma discourse has become overextended, commercialized, or detached from its clinical origins.

== Origins and development ==
The rise of trauma culture is often traced to increased public awareness of post-traumatic stress disorder (PTSD) in the late 20th century, particularly in relation to war veterans and survivors of large-scale violence such as the Holocaust. Holocaust testimony and memory studies played a foundational role in shaping cultural understandings of trauma, emphasizing witnessing, survivor narratives, and the moral authority of victim testimony. From the 1980s onward, trauma discourse expanded beyond catastrophic events to include childhood abuse, domestic violence, and emotional neglect, coinciding with the growth of psychotherapy culture, memoir publishing, and confessional media formats.

== Key characteristics ==
=== Expansion of trauma as a concept ===
In trauma culture, trauma is often applied to a broad range of distressing experiences, including those not traditionally classified as traumatic in clinical psychology. Critics argue this risks diluting the term’s clinical meaning, while supporters maintain that it validates previously overlooked forms of harm.

=== Narrative centrality of suffering and survivor identity ===
Trauma culture places significant emphasis on first-person narratives of pain and survival, which are frequently treated as morally authoritative and resistant to critique. Storytelling becomes a primary means of achieving recognition and legitimacy. The figure of the survivor occupies a central position in trauma culture, often functioning as a source of moral authority and cultural capital. Scholars note that this emphasis may unintentionally reduce individuals to their traumatic experiences.

== Trauma and media ==
=== Literature and publishing ===
Trauma culture is closely associated with the rise of misery memoirs and trauma-centered fiction. These works emphasize extreme suffering and emotional authenticity and are frequently marketed as true or deeply personal accounts. Critics argue that the “trauma plot” has become a dominant and limiting narrative structure, that focuses almost obsessively on a character’s past suffering as the defining force of their personality and actions.

=== Commercialization and commodification ===
Trauma culture is frequently analyzed in relation to consumer capitalism. Trauma-related books, workshops, retreats, and wellness products form a substantial market, raising ethical concerns about exploitation and authenticity. Daytime talk shows, reality television, podcasts, and social media platforms have normalized public confessions of trauma. Algorithm-driven platforms such as TikTok have encouraged simplified and repetitive trauma narratives, often linking everyday behaviors to past harm. Scholars argue that trauma can function as a brand or identity rather than a clinical condition, and that this can lead to competitive victimhood, where cultural value is attached to the extremity of suffering.

== Defenses and counterarguments ==
Defenders argue that trauma culture has increased visibility for marginalized experiences and reduced stigma surrounding mental health. Some scholars advocate distinguishing between clinical trauma, cultural trauma, and metaphorical uses of trauma language rather than rejecting trauma discourse entirely.
