= Sarah (LeRoy novel) =

2000 novel by JT LeRoy

- Author: JT LeRoy
- Language: English
- Genre: Novel
- Publisher: Bloomsbury
- Publication date: 2000
- Publication place: United States
- Media type: Paperback
- Pages: 166 pp (paperback edition)
- ISBN: 0-7475-4928-1 (paperback edition)
- OCLC: 44059140

Sarah is a novel by Laura Albert, written under the name JT LeRoy, a persona that she has described as an "avatar," asserting that it enabled her to write things she could not have said as herself.

Sarah is narrated by an unnamed boy whose mother Sarah is a lot lizard: a prostitute who works the truck stops in West Virginia. She can be abusive and abandoning, yet he longs for her love and has begun wearing her clothes and imitating her.

== Plot summary ==
The boy agrees to work for Glad, a benevolent pimp who specializes in "boy-girls." Glad gives him a raccoon penis bone, which he wears as an amulet for protection, good fortune, and sexual prowess as well as to signify his status as one of Glad's boy-girls. He is given the name Cherry Vanilla, but on his first date with a trucker he uses the name Sarah.

Hoping to outperform his rejecting mother and become the greatest lot lizard of them all, he goes off on his own into the wilds of West Virginia and is eventually taken up by a very powerful and very dangerous pimp known as Le Loup. Unaware that this new girl is a boy, Le Loup uses him not to turn tricks but as an object of veneration – and donations – with luck-conscious and magic-fearing truckers. Eventually Saint Sarah's mystique fades, and when he is revealed to be a boy Le Loup forces him to work alongside other boy prostitutes and live in captivity with them. After an agonizing year, Glad is finally able to rescue him from Le Loup, but the boy who returns is no longer capable of rejoining Glad's boy-girls; his mother Sarah is long gone as well.

Sarah uses narrative elements and characterizations that also occur in the short stories of The Heart Is Deceitful Above All Things (2001). But unlike The Heart or Harold's End (2004), Sarah is rich in humor and more fabulistic in its characters and situations. These qualities temper the harsh themes this novel shares with the other JT LeRoy books: abuse, exploitation, abandonment, betrayal, loss. Like them, it also explores the dynamics of identity and gender and employs the plot situation of having one's hidden life exposed and the shaming, hostility, and violence that ensue. Poet and critic Stephanie Burt called Sarah "a work of art" and "a book about the risks and thrills of false identity," which derives its power "from the glee with which it refuses realism: multiple subjects (sexual trauma, coming out, rural poverty) that American fiction usually depicts with flat-footed seriousness instead come together for a Technicolor romp."

== In popular culture ==
The song "Cherry Lips" by Garbage refers to Cherry Vanilla from Sarah and the persona of JT LeRoy. The song "Sarah" by Bat for Lashes was also inspired by the novel Sarah.

Blackstone Audio released an audiobook of Sarah in 2020, with actor Winsome Brown reading the novel and artist/filmmaker Leigh Ledare reading the foreword written by Billy Corgan for the novel's 2016 reissue by HarperCollins.

== See also ==
- Misery literature
- Fake memoir
