= List of fake memoirs and journals =

A fake memoir is a book that was published with the assertion that the events depicted are substantially true, but are later discovered or strongly asserted to be false: a book does not have to be entirely fictional to be considered a fake memoir. In contrast, a book which openly acknowledges that its author has fictionalized elements while still drawing on their own life may be more properly considered an autobiographical novel.

Entries are organized by the original publication date of the work in question.

== 19th century ==
The Awful Disclosures of Maria Monk cover

- Maria Monk, Awful Disclosures of Maria Monk: as Exhibited in a Narrative of Her Sufferings During a Residence of Five Years as a Novice, and Two Years as a Black Nun, in the Hôtel-Dieu Nunnery at Montreal, Howe & Bates, New York (1836), is a wildly sensationalistic story of life in a Montreal convent where nuns were forced to have sex with the priests in the seminary next door. Monk's descriptions of events have been found inconsistent with her physical surroundings, leading to assertions that it may have been a hoax perpetrated by her publisher or ghostwriters.
- Davy Crockett, Col. Crockett's exploits and adventures in Texas: wherein is contained a full account of his journey from Tennessee to the Red River and Natchitoches, and thence across Texas to San Antonio; including many hair-breadth escapes; together with a topographical, historical, and political view of Texas ... Written by Himself, T.K. and P.G. Collins, Philadelphia (1836), was supposedly Crockett’s journal taken at the Alamo by Mexican General Castrillón and then recovered at the Battle of San Jacinto, but was in fact written by Richard Penn Smith and Charles T. Beale. The work has been called an "ingenious pseudo-autobiography."

== 1901–1950 ==
- Philip Aegidius Walshe (actually Montgomery Carmichael), The Life of John William Walshe, F.S.A., London, Burns & Oates, (1901); New York, E. P. Dutton (1902). This book was presented as a son’s story of his father’s life in Italy as “a profound mystic and student of everything relating to St. Francis of Assisi,” but the son, the father and the memoir were all invented by Montgomery Carmichael.
- Edmund Backhouse, China Under the Empress Dowager: being the History of the Life and Times of Tzu Hsi, Compiled from State Papers and the Private Diary of the Comptroller of her Household, London, Heinemann; Philadelphia, J. B. Lippincott & Co. (1910). The diary (Diary of His Excellency Ching Shan) on which the book was based was proven in 1976 to have been forged by Backhouse.
- Abel Fosdyk (likely A. Howard Linford), the Abel Fosdyk papers, published in The Strand Magazine, 1913. The papers presented a story, in diary form, of the mystery of the abandoned Mary Celeste, and had been written by a supposed passenger. In 1924, J.G. Lockhart's Mysteries of the Sea highlighted a number of discrepancies in the papers; Lockhart concluded that the papers had been forged by Linford.
- William Francis Mannix, The Memoirs of Li Hung Chang (1913). The memoirs on which the book were based, seemingly having been written by Li Hongzhang and edited by Mannix, were revealed in 1923 to have been forged by Mannix.
- Chief Buffalo Child Long Lance (actually Sylvester Clark Long), Long Lance, Cosmopolitan Book Company (1928). The book presented Lance as having been born the son of a Blackfoot chief in Montana's Sweetgrass Hills, to have been wounded eight times in World War I, and promoted to the rank of captain. In fact, the story was fabricated: Lance was an African-American born in Winston-Salem, North Carolina.
- Joan Lowell, Cradle of the Deep, Simon & Schuster (1929). The book presented the story of Lowell as a girl who, before she was even a year old, was taken away from her ailing mother by her sea captain father to live on the Minnie A. Caine, a trading ship, and that she had lived on the ship with its all-male crew until she was 17, when the ship burned and sank off the coast of Australia as Lowell swam three miles to safety with a family of kittens clinging by their claws to her back. In fact, Lowell had been on the ship, which remained safe in California, for only 15 months. The book was a sensational best seller until its events were exposed as fiction.
- John Knyveton (actually Ernest Gray), The Diary of a Surgeon in the Year 1751-1752, edited and transcribed by Ernest Gray, New York, D. Appleton-Century (1938); Surgeon's Mate: the diary of John Knyveton, surgeon in the British fleet during the Seven Years' War 1756-1762, edited and transcribed by Ernest Gray, London, Robert Hale (1942); and Man midwife; the further experiences of John Knyveton, M.D., late surgeon in the British fleet, during the years 1763-1809, edited and transcribed by Ernest Gray, London, Robert Hale (1946). The three medical diaries were well received when published, but doubts were later raised about their authenticity: they were proven in 2014 to have been forged by Gray, being loosely based on a short biography of Dr Thomas Denman.

== 1951–2000 ==
- Friedrich Nietzsche, My Sister and I (1951) was supposedly written in 1889 or early 1890 during Nietzsche's stay in a mental asylum. It makes several bold and otherwise unreported claims, most notably of an incestuous relationship between Nietzsche and his sister.
- Louis Le Golif, Cahiers de Louis Adhemar Timothée Le Golif, dit Borgnefesse, capitaine de la flibuste (1952), translated into English as The Memoirs of a Buccaneer: Being a Wondrous and Unrepentant Account of the Prodigious Adventures and Amours of King Louis XIV’s Loyal Servant, Louis Adhemar Timothée Le Golif, Known for His Singular Wound As Borgnefesse, Captain of the Buccaneers, Told by Himself (1954), was presented as the long-lost manuscript of a 17th century French sea captain involved in pirate activities in the Caribbean. It was disregarded by most academics immediately, and is now considered an entertaining work of maritime fiction.
- Slavomir Rawicz, The Long Walk (originally published 1955) is a ghostwritten book in which Rawicz, who was a Polish Army lieutenant imprisoned by the NKVD after the German-Soviet invasion of Poland, claimed to have escaped in 1941 from a Siberian Gulag camp and traveled approximately 6,500 km on foot through the Gobi Desert, Tibet, and the Himalayas to reach British India. In 2006, the BBC released evidence showing that Rawicz had not escaped, but in fact had been released and transported to Iran. Another Polish WWII veteran, Witold Gliński, has since claimed that he, not Rawicz, was the person who actually made "the long walk".
- Carlos Castaneda wrote a series of books that describe his training in traditional Mesoamerican shamanism, starting with The Teachings of Don Juan, University of California Press (1968). His 12 books have sold more than eight million copies in 17 languages, but scholars of the Yaqui ethnic group have disputed the veracity of his publications.
- Anonymous (actually Beatrice Sparks), Go Ask Alice, Prentice-Hall (1971), was originally presented as being the real diary of an anonymous teenage girl who died of a drug overdose in the late 1960s. Sparks later became known for producing several additional books purporting to be the "real diaries" of troubled teenagers. Before the book's authenticity was challenged, The New York Times praised it as an "extraordinary work for teenagers" and "a document of horrifying reality and literary quality". It was later reclassified by its publishers as fiction.
- Clifford Irving, The Autobiography of Howard Hughes, McGraw-Hill (1972), was a forged autobiography of the reclusive billionaire. Irving served 17 months in prison after confessing to the hoax.
- Forrest Carter (pseud. Asa Earl Carter), The Education of Little Tree, Delacorte Press (1976), was presented as the author's memoir about growing up among the Cherokee, but is in fact fiction written by a former white supremacist.
- David Rorvik, In his Image: the Cloning of a Man, J. B. Lippincott, Philadelphia and New York (1978), in which he claimed to have been part of a successful endeavor to create a clone of a human being. In a subsequent defamation suit, a court found the book was a hoax; while the publisher subsequently acknowledged this, Rorvik continues to maintain it is truthful.
- Cleo Birdwell (pseud. Don DeLillo), Amazons (1980), a forged memoir of the first woman to play in the National Hockey League, which DeLillo notoriously refused to acknowledge authorship of for 40 years.
- Michelle Remembers (1980) was presented as the true account of Michelle Smith's recovered memories of childhood Satanic ritual abuse, recorded with her psychiatrist, Lawrence Pazder. The book became highly influential, helping to fuel the Satanic Panic of the 1980s. Investigators, journalists, and scholars found no credible evidence supporting its claims, and numerous inconsistencies undermined its credibility. It is widely regarded as a fabricated memoir that exemplifies the dangers of recovered-memory narratives and moral panic.
- Konrad Kujau forged The Hitler Diaries in 1983. When first published in the Sunday Times, the diaries were authenticated by the historian Hugh Trevor-Roper, but they were demonstrated to be crude fakes, written on modern paper, within a few weeks.
- Lauren Stratford (pseud. Laurel Rose Willson), Satan's Underground, Harvest House, Oregon (1988), purporting to tell a true story of her upbringing in a Satanic cult, but it was later deemed to be fabricated. She subsequently assumed the guise of a Holocaust survivor under the alias of Laura Grabowski, which was also revealed to be false.
- Marlo Morgan, Mutant Message Down Under, MM Co. (self-published), Lees Summit, Missouri (1991); HarperCollins, New York (1994). The book claimed to be a memoir of her time spent with Aboriginals, but has caused protests by Aboriginal groups. Parts of it have been asserted to be invented, and the publisher has reissued it labeled as fiction.
- Anthony Godby Johnson, A Rock and a Hard Place: One Boy's Triumphant Story, Crown Books, New York; Little Brown, London (1993), is the story of a young boy, sexually abused by his parents and later adopted, who discovers he is HIV-positive and who develops AIDS. This book has been challenged on a number of accounts, and is alleged to be the fictional product of Vicki Johnson, also known as Vicki Fraginals Zackheim. "Tony," the subject of the book, made an "appearance" on the Oprah Winfrey Show, but was interviewed with his face obscured.
- Wanda Koolmatrie (actually Leon Carmen), My Own Sweet Time, Magabala Books, Australia (1994), was presented as an autobiographical account by an Aboriginal woman born in 1949, who was taken from her mother and raised by white foster parents. Its actual author was Leon Carmen, a white Australian man and taxi driver with literary aspirations who believed that he could not have been published under his own identity. The publisher discovered the hoax when Carmen attempted to publish a sequel.
- Helen Demidenko (psued. Helen Darville, also known as Helen Dale), The Hand That Signed the Paper, Allen & Unwin, Australia (1994) was presented as an autobiographical story of a student’s discovery of her family's bleak wartime history as peasants in Ukraine under Stalinism, and their “liberation” by the Nazi invasion. In reality, the author had no Ukrainian family and was the daughter of British immigrants to Australia. The deception was revealed by the Australian media when the novel won the Miles Franklin Award.
- Binjamin Wilkomirski (real name Bruno Dössekker), Fragments: Memories of a Wartime Childhood, Schocken Books (US edition, 1996), is an acclaimed but fabricated Holocaust memoir. Before it was exposed as fabricated, The New York Times called the book "stunning", the Los Angeles Times described it as a "classic first-hand account of the Holocaust", it received the 1996 National Jewish Book Award for Autobiography and Memoir, in Britain it received the Jewish Quarterly Literary Prize, and in France it was awarded the Prix Memoire de la Shoah.
- Misha Defonseca (real name Monique de Wael), Misha: A Mémoire of the Holocaust Years, Mt. Ivy Press (1997) is a fabricated memoir of a supposed Holocaust survivor who walked 1,900 miles across Europe searching for her parents, killed a German officer in self-defense, and lived with a pack of wolves. The work was a best seller, being translated into 18 languages and made into a movie.

== 2001–present ==
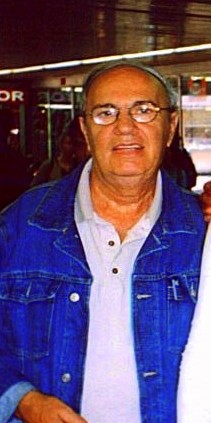
Herman Rosenblat

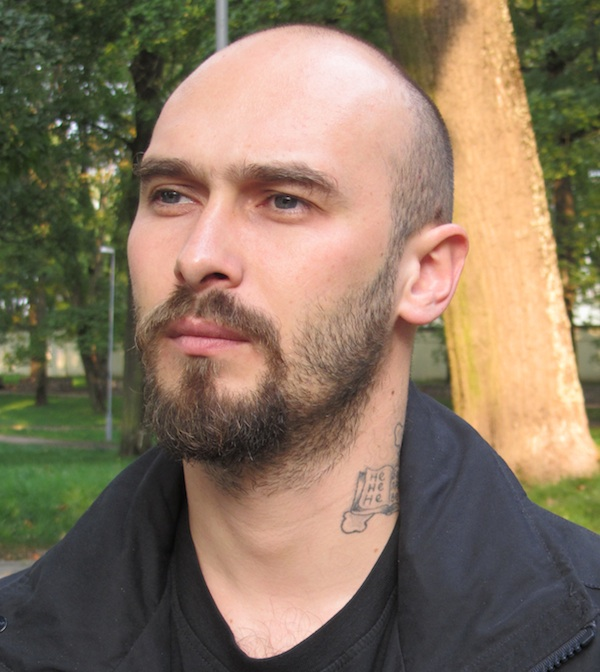
Nicolai Lilin

- Nasdijj (pseud. Timothy Patrick "Tim" Barrus), The Blood Runs Like a River Through My Dreams, Houghton Mifflin (2000), The Boy and the Dog Are Sleeping (2003), and Geronimo's Bones: A Memoir of My Brother and Me (2004). These works recounted various aspects of the author's supposed life, including his Navajo heritage, his self-destructive and abusive parents, his unhappy childhood as a migrant worker, his dysfunctional relationships with other family members, and, eventually, his growing up to become the nurturing father of two adopted children, one with fetal alcohol syndrome and one who is HIV-positive. Before it was exposed as fabricated, The Blood Runs Like a River Through My Dreams was a New York Times Notable Book, a finalist for the PEN/Martha Albrand Award, and winner of the Salon Book Award. It was described by Esquire in a cover blurb as an "authentic, important book...Unfailingly honest and very nearly perfect."
- Tom Carew (pseud. Philip Sessarego), Jihad! – The Secret War in Afghanistan, Mainstream Publishing (2000). The book, purporting to be written by a 14-year Special Air Service veteran, detailed the author's experiences training the Afghan mujahideen during the Soviet-Afghan War. In November 2001, an investigation led by BBC reporter George Eykyn found that several former SAS troopers disputed the biographical claims made in the book and recognized the author as Sessarego, a two-year veteran of the Royal Artillery who had been twice rejected from the SAS. Eykyn confronted Sessarego, who received significant media publicity as a former SAS trooper and expert on the Taliban as Tom Carew, on Newsnight as well as Adrian Weale, Sessarego's ghostwriter. According to The Guardian, Sessarego "did spend some time in Afghanistan, but his account of what he did there was not based on reality."
- Michael Gambino (pseud. Michael Pelligrino), The Honored Society, Simon & Schuster (2001). This book, supposedly by the grandson of Mafioso Carlo Gambino, described his life as a gangster, including spending 12 years in prison for bribery, gambling, extortion, kidnapping, money laundering, murder and pimping. After Carlo Gambino’s real son, Thomas Gambino, exposed the fraud, the publisher withdrew the book.
- Tom Abraham, The Cage, Corgi (2002) was about his time in the Vietnam War. In the book, he claimed to have been a prisoner of, and subsequently escaped from, the Viet Cong. This was disputed by veteran's groups, who noted that Abraham does not appear on The Pentagon's definitive list of Vietnam War soldiers known to have been missing in action or prisoners of war.
- James Frey, A Million Little Pieces, Doubleday Books (a division of Random House) (2003) is a bestselling memoir in which the author created and exaggerated significant details of his drug addiction and recovery. The author appeared on The Oprah Winfrey Show, and in September 2005, the book became an Oprah's Book Club selection. However, when the book's authenticity was called into question, the author and publisher Nan Talese were invited back and publicly scolded by Winfrey in a live face-to-face confrontation. The media feasted over the televised showdown. David Carr of the New York Times wrote, "Both Mr. Frey and Ms. Talese were snapped in two like dry winter twigs." "Oprah annihilates Frey," proclaimed Larry King. New York Times columnist Maureen Dowd wrote, "It was a huge relief, after our long national slide into untruth and no consequences, into Swift boating and swift bucks, into W.'s delusion and denial, to see the Empress of Empathy icily hold someone accountable for lying," and the Washington Post's Richard Cohen was so impressed by the confrontation that he crowned Winfrey "Mensch of the Year."
- Norma Khouri, Forbidden Love (published as Honor Lost in the United States), Bantam Books, Australia (2003); Doubleday, New York (2003) was purported to be the story of the author's best friend in Jordan, Dalia, who fell in love with a Christian soldier. Dalia's Muslim father was not told of the relationship, and when he eventually discovered it, he stabbed Dalia to death in a so-called honor killing. The book was exposed as a hoax after the literary editor of the Sydney Morning Herald revealed that Khouri had not lived in Jordan during the book's timeframe, and apart from a three-week stay to research her book, had not lived there since her early childhood.
- JT LeRoy (pseud. Laura Victoria Albert) published a number of fabricated works (c. 2005) in which LeRoy was presented as a transgender, sexually questioning, abused, former homeless teenage drug addict and male prostitute.
- A. L. Finch's Child P.O.W. ― A Memoir of Survival (three self-published US editions, 2007, 2008 and 2011), were about a mother and child’s experience as internees in Japanese captivity in the Philippines during the Second World War, but has been exposed as a fabricated account. Finch is the pen name of A. L. Peeples of Lakewood, Washington. The University of Puget Sound published a cover profile of Finch / Peeples in the Autumn 2009 edition of its alumni magazine Arches, but later removed that edition from its website.
- Margaret Seltzer (pseud. Margaret B. Jones), Love and Consequences, Riverhead Books (a division of Penguin Group USA) (2008) was a critically received memoir of a girl, part white and part native American, growing up in South-Central Los Angeles as a foster child in a world of drug dealers and gang members. In fact, the work was exposed as completely fabricated by Seltzer's sister. Before it was exposed, the book was praised as "humane and deeply affecting" by Michiko Kakutani of The New York Times.
- Nicolai Lilin's Siberian Education (2009), a supposedly autobiographical novel recounting the author's alleged childhood as a member of the "Urkas", an ethnic group from Siberia deported to Transnistria in the 1930s which formed a criminal organization. Several historians, journalists and former acquaintances of the author have demonstrated that this narrative is largely invented, most notably because the victims of population transfer in the Soviet Union were sent from Europe to Siberia, but never the reverse, and Lilin himself is of Polish rather than Siberian origin. He would write a sequel, Free Fall (2010), recounting his experiences as a sniper during the Second Chechen War, though it was found that his name didn't appear in any source close to the Russian Ministry of Defence.
- Matt McCarthy, Odd Man Out: A Year on the Mound with a Minor League Misfit, Viking (a division of Penguin Group USA) (February 2009) is a memoir describing McCarthy's summer as a minor league pitcher. He writes about playing with racist teammates who take steroids: however, statistics from that season, combined with transaction listings and interviews with former teammates, suggest that much of the book is false. Before its authenticity was challenged, the book was promoted by Sports Illustrated. Carolyn Coleburn, the publisher's vice president and director of publicity said, “We rely on our authors to tell the truth and fact-check.” McCarthy later published another memoir of his first year as a medical intern (2016's The Real Doctor Will See You Shortly) which did not trigger claims of false reporting. McCarthy is currently a physician, researcher, and medical ethics professor.
- Herman Rosenblat, Angel at the Fence: The True Story of a Love That Survived (February 2009, cancelled) is a Holocaust memoir in which the author invented the story that, while he was imprisoned in the Buchenwald concentration camp, a young girl from the outside would pass him food through the fence daily and years later they accidentally met and married. Rosenblat appeared twice on The Oprah Winfrey Show. Before the book's announced publication, Winfrey called the story "the single greatest love story, in 22 years of doing this show, we've ever told on the air." The book was scheduled for publication in February 2009 by Berkley Books, a division of Penguin Group USA, but has been cancelled. Although the author fabricated details about how he met his wife, he is an authentic Holocaust survivor.
- Enkeli-Elisa (2012) is the name utilized for the protagonist of a fictional story that purported to depict the suicide of the aforementioned protagonist. The story was later discovered to be fictional through later investigative journalism.
- Raynor Winn's The Salt Path (2018) became the subject of controversy after revelations that key elements of the memoir were fabricated or significantly embellished. Investigative reporting questioned aspects of the couple's homelessness, financial circumstances, and the portrayal of Moth Winn's illness.
