= List of fictional diaries =

The first installment of Diary of a Nobody in Punch (1888)

This is a list of fictional diaries categorized by type, including fictional works in diary form, diaries appearing in fictional works, and hoax diaries.

The first category, fictional works in diary form, lists fictional works where the story, or a major part of the story, is told in the form of a character's diary. Diary form is frequently used in fiction for young adults and tweens as well as adults. It has been used for multiple books in a series following the diarist's life over many years, such as the Adrian Mole series, the Diary of a Wimpy Kid series, and the Dork Diaries series, all of which chronicle the lives of characters who start a diary as children or adolescents and continue their diary as they mature over time. Fictionalised diaries set during distinct historical periods or events have been used since at least the 1970s to bring history to life for young people. Dear America, My Australian Story and related series are recent examples of this genre. The form is also frequently used for fiction about adult women's lives, some notable examples being Bridget Jones's Diary, The Color Purple, and Pamela.

The second category lists fictional works that are not written in diary form, but in which a character keeps a diary, or a diary is otherwise featured as part of the story. Some common uses for diaries in fiction are to reveal to the reader material that is concealed from other characters, to divulge information about past events, or as a device to provide real or false evidence to investigators in mystery or crime fiction. Examples of diaries being used in one of these ways include Amy Dunne's false diary in Gone Girl and Laura Palmer's secret diary in Twin Peaks.

The third category lists hoax diaries, that were presented as being true diaries of real people when first published, but were later discovered to be fiction. Go Ask Alice, the first of a number of books by Beatrice Sparks purported to be based on diaries of real teenagers, was originally presented by Sparks as the non-fictional diary of an anonymous teenage girl, but was later classified by publishers as fiction. The fourth category is real person fiction.

== Fictional works in diary form ==
- Alice, I Think by Susan Juby
- The Amazing Days of Abby Hayes series by Anne Mazer
- The American Diary of a Japanese Girl by Yone Noguchi
- Any Human Heart:The Intimate Journals of Logan Mountstuart by William Boyd
- The Basic Eight by Daniel Handler
- Bert Diaries by Anders Jacobsson and Sören Olsson.
- The Book of the New Sun by Gene Wolfe
- The Book of Ebenezer Le Page by Gerald Basil Edwards
- Bridget Jones's Diary series by Helen Fielding
- The Brightfount Diaries by Brian Aldiss
- The Bunker Diary by Kevin Brooks
- California Diaries (series) by Ann M. Martin
- Catherine, Called Birdy by Karen Cushman
- Charmed Thirds by Megan McCafferty
- The Color Purple by Alice Walker
- Confessions of Georgia Nicolson by Louise Rennison
- Dangling Man by Saul Bellow
- Dear America, Dear Canada and My America, series of historical novels for children
- Dear Dumb Diary by Jim Benton
- The Debt to Pleasure by John Lanchester
- Diary by Chuck Palahniuk
- Diary of a Chav series by Grace Dent
- Diary of a Country Priest by Georges Bernanos
- The Diary of Ellen Rimbauer: My Life at Rose Red by Ridley Pearson
- The Diaries of Emilio Renzi (3 volumes: The Formative Years, The Happy Years, A Day in the Life) by Ricardo Piglia
- "Diary of a Madman" by Nikolai Gogol; this title has also been used by Lu Xun and Guy de Maupassant
- Diary of a Nobody by George Grossmith and Weedon Grossmith
- Diary of a Pilgrimage by Jerome K Jerome
- Diary of a Provincial Lady by E.M. Delafield (and subsequent novels in the series)
- The Diary of Samuel Marchbanks by Robertson Davies
- Diary of a Seducer by Søren Kierkegaard
- Diary of a Somebody by Christopher Matthew
- Diary of a Wimpy Kid series by Jeff Kinney
- Dinotopia by James Gurney
- Don't You Dare Read This, Mrs. Dunphrey by Margaret Peterson Haddix
- Dork Diaries by Rachel Renée Russell
- Double Eclipse by Melissa de la Cruz
- Dracula by Bram Stoker
- Flowers for Algernon by Daniel Keyes
- From the Files of Madison Finn series by Laura Dower
- A Gathering of Days by Joan W. Blos
- Gentlemen Prefer Blondes by Anita Loos
- Go Ask Malice: A Slayer's Diary by Robert Joseph Levy
- Heart by Edmondo De Amicis
- Hidden Passions: Secrets from the Diaries of Tabitha Lenox by Alice Alfonsi and James E. Reilly
- The Horla by Guy de Maupassant
- Houseboy by Ferdinand Oyono
- I Capture the Castle by Dodie Smith
- I Trissy by Norma Fox Mazer
- Jazmin's Notebook by Nikki Grimes
- A Journal of the Plague Year by Daniel Defoe
- The Lacuna by Barbara Kingsolver
- The Little White Bird by J.M. Barrie
- Love That Dog by Sharon Creech
- The Lost Diaries of Nigel Molesworth by Geoffrey Willans
- The Luminous Novel by Mario Levrero
- Memoirs of Miss Sidney Bidulph by Frances Sheridan
- The Memory Book of Starr Faithfull: A Novel by Gloria Vanderbilt
- Michael: A German Destiny in Diary Form by Joseph Goebbels
- The Moneypenny Diaries by Samantha Weinberg (under the pseudonym Kate Westbrook)
- A Month of Sundays by John Updike
- The Moth Diaries by Rachel Klein
- My Story, My Australian Story, My Story (New Zealand), My Name Is America, series of historical novels for children
- Myra Breckinridge by Gore Vidal
- Nausea by Jean-Paul Sartre
- Notes on a Scandal by Zoë Heller
- Parable of the Sower by Octavia E. Butler
- Parable of the Talents by Octavia E. Butler
- The Pendragon Adventure by D. J. MacHale (a series of ten novels)
- Penny Pollard's Diary by Robin Klein
- The Posthumous Memoirs of Brás Cubas by Machado de Assis
- The Princess Diaries by Meg Cabot
- Random Acts of Senseless Violence by Jack Womack
- Runaway by Wendelin Van Draanen
- Second Helpings by Megan McCafferty
- The Secret Diary of Adrian Mole, Aged 13¾ by Sue Townsend, and others in the series
- The Secret Diary of Anne Boleyn by Robin Maxwell
- The Secret Diary of Laura Palmer by Jennifer Lynch
- Sloppy Firsts by Megan McCafferty
- So Much To Tell You by John Marsden
- Spud by John van de Ruit and others in the series
- The Story of B by Daniel Quinn
- Suzanne's Diary for Nicholas by James Patterson
- The Tale of Murasaki by Liza Dalby
- The Turner Diaries by William Luther Pierce (under the pseudonym Andrew MacDonald)
- The Unselected Journals of Emma M. Lion, volumes 1-8, by Beth Brower
- The Vampire Diaries by L. J. Smith (This has only partial diary entries in diary format. The rest of the book is in text form.)
- The Yellow Wallpaper by Charlotte Perkins Gilman
- Youth in Revolt by C.D. Pyane
- Z for Zachariah by Robert C. O'Brien
- Z213: Exit by Dimitris Lyacos
- Zama by Antonio Di Benedetto

== Diaries appearing in fictional works ==
- Adventure Time "The Diary" (animated episode): Nurse Poundcake keeps her diary.
- Andělská srdce (Angelic Hearts) by Anna Řeháková
- An Unkindness of Ghosts by Rivers Solomon: Lune keeps journals.
- The Basic Eight by Daniel Handler: Flannery Culp keeps diaries.
- Cloud Atlas, by David Mitchell. Sections of the novel deal with the Pacific Journal of Adam Ewing.
- Doctor Who (television series): The Doctor keeps a "500 year diary", Joan Redfern keeps "A Journal of Impossible Things", and Melody Pond/ River Song keeps "River Song's Diary".
- Elfquest (comics): Cam Triomphe keeps a diary (mentioned in the sub-series Fire-Eye and The Rebels).
- The End of the Affair by Graham Greene: Part of the narrative is revealed through a diary stolen from Sarah by the narrator, Maurice Bendrix.
- Future Diary (manga and anime): The combatants of the battle royale game each have their own unique cellphone diary with special abilities of describing the future.
- Gone Girl by Gillian Flynn: Amy Dunne keeps a diary.
- Harry Potter and the Chamber of Secrets by J. K. Rowling: A magical diary created by Tom Riddle plays a role in the story and is eventually destroyed.
- Homestuck, by Andrew Hussie. Mindfang keeps a journal. Rose chronicles her adventures within Sburb.
- Indiana Jones and the Last Crusade (film): Dr. Henry Walton Jones Sr. keeps a "Grail Diary".
- John Winchester's diary in the TV show Supernatural: The diary Sam and Dean's father keeps to record a list of supernatural creatures.
- Lolita by Vladimir Nabokov: The narrator Humbert keeps a diary, where he records his secret thoughts about Lolita and her mother.
- Low Red Moon by Caitlín R. Kiernan: Caroline Snow keeps a diary.
- Mort and other Discworld books by Terry Pratchett: The diaries of every sentient being ever to live on the Discworld appear.
- Mother Night by Kurt Vonnegut: Memoirs of a Monogamous Casanova is the erotic diary of protagonist Howard W. Campbell.
- Mrs Dale's Diary (BBC Radio Series): The diary mentioned in the title is part of the story.
- Ready Player One: Upon death, James Donovan Halliday releases Anorak's Almanac, an extensive look into the pop-culture he consumed.
- The Saga of Darren Shan by Darren Shan: The character Darren Shan keeps a diary.
- Star Trek episodes often contain entries in the Captain's log.
- Superman (comics): Superman keeps a giant-sized diary at his Fortress of Solitude.
- The Tenant of Wildfell Hall by Anne Brontë: The character Helen Graham gives the narrator Gilbert Markham her diaries to read; the diaries constitute the second volume of the novel.
- Twin Peaks (television series) by David Lynch: Laura Palmer keeps a diary.
- V for Vendetta: Dr Delia Surrige keeps a diary.
- Voyage of the Dawn Treader by C. S. Lewis: Eustace Clarence Scrubb keeps a diary.
- The Vampire Diaries (television series): Elena Gilbert, Jonathan Gilbert, and Stefan Salvatore all keep journals.
- Watchmen: The vigilante Rorschach keeps a journal which becomes a significant plot point.

== Hoax diaries ==
- Go Ask Alice by Beatrice Sparks (1971), who was known for producing books purporting to be the "real diaries" from troubled teens (including Jay's Journal)
- Hitler Diaries by Konrad Kujau (1983)
- Mussolini diaries
- The Diary of a Farmer's Wife 1796-1797 by Anne Hughes
- Three medical diaries by John Knyveton (actually by Ernest Gray):

- The Diary of a Surgeon in the Year 1751–1752 (1938)
- Surgeon's Mate: the diary of John Knyveton, surgeon in the British fleet during the Seven Years War 1756–1762 (1942)
- Man midwife; the further experiences of John Knyveton, M.D., late surgeon in the British fleet, during the years 1763–1809 (1946)

- Diary of Elizabeth Pepys (1991) by Dale Spender
- The Journal of Mrs Pepys (1998) by Sara George.

== See also ==
- List of fake memoirs and journals
- Epistolary novel
- List of diarists
