= Enkeli-Elisa =

Character created by Minttu Vettenterä

Enkeli-Elisa (Finnish for 'Elisa the Angel') is the name used for the main character in a story written by Finnish author Minttu Vettenterä in 2012, which first spread on the Internet and as a self-published book titled Jonakin päivänä kaduttaa ("Someday There Will Be Regrets") and thus spread through the media. The story is about a 15-year-old girl who was bullied at school and was claimed to have committed suicide. An organisation against school bullying was founded because of the story. Although fictional, the narrative was presented as truthful by much of the media, until the Helsingin Sanomat monthly supplement questioned the veracity of the events in July 2012 and the police began investigating the matter as a crime. During police interrogations, Vettenterä admitted that Elisa's parents were not real people, but, according to her, the story is based on real people and events.

== Internet publicity, book project and association ==
The basis for the publicity received by the Enkeli-Elisa story had been Minttu Vettenterä's blog, a memorial site for Elisa, a Facebook page dedicated to Elisa, Vettenterä's self-published book Jonakin päivänä kaduttaa, and a blog that Vettenterä said had been written by Elisa's parents. In February 2012, there were reports about Enkeli-Elisa in magazines, on television and on radio. In July 2012, Elisa's Facebook group had over 40 thousand members.

An association against school bullying named Ei kiusata! ("Let's not bully people!") was founded in March 2012. Sony Music was one of the partners of the association, which was founded based on the Enkeli-Elisa story and was officially registered on 7 August 2012.

== Questions about veracity ==
In July 2012, an article in the Helsingin Sanomat monthly supplement questioned the existence of Enkeli-Elisa and said that two blog texts said to have been written by different authors both repeated the same words, sentence structures, and typographical errors. According to information received by the newspaper, no 15-year-old girls had died on the day Enkeli-Elisa was said to have died. The article also said that Elisa's parents had only ever commented on the matter through Vettenterä.

Because of the publicity received by the event, the police started an investigation to find out whether Vettenterä was guilty of fraud. The investigation was stopped because neither the accuser nor the police thought Vettenterä was guilty. During the interrogation, Vettenterä admitted that Elisa's parents were not real people, but according to her, the story was based on real people and events.

== Reactions ==
According to Risto Uimonen, the chairman of the Council for Mass Media in Finland, the media should have more rigorously assessed the accuracy of the story, because if its truthfulness were in question, this should also have been conveyed to the readers.

Tuula-Liina Varis, the chairman of the Union of Finnish Writers, thought Vettenterä's act was ethically questionable, when she first claimed her story was true and then appealed to author's freedom, causing a moral conflict. According to Varis, it is permissible to create a fictional character, as long as it is announced as fictional.

Youth work expert Ossi Heinänen said in an interview with Turun Sanomat that he felt the event was problematic in regard to the believability of charity organisations. He feared that possible misunderstandings could lead to real causes of bullying being doubted and that people would no longer want to support work done to prevent bullying.

According to experts interviewed by the monthly supplement of Helsingin Sanomat, the Elisa story is also problematic because it painted a romantic idea of suicide. In other events, romanticisation of suicide has led to an increase in suicide. As well as this, the newspaper said that the campaign formed around the Elisa story bypasses the work done in Finnish schools to prevent bullying.

In March 2013, the authors of the article in the Helsingin Sanomat monthly supplement, Anu Silfverberg and Hanna Nikkanen, were awarded the Bonnier journalist prize for the best article in 2012.

== See also ==
- Misery literature
- Belle Gibson
- Go Ask Alice
- Fake memoir
