= My Friend Leonard =

Memoir by James Frey

- Cover of the first edition
- Author: James Frey
- Language: English
- Genre: Memoir/Fiction
- Published: June 16, 2005 Random House
- Publication place: United States
- Media type: Print (hardcover and paperback)
- ISBN: 1-57322-315-8
- OCLC: 57652189
- Dewey Decimal: 362.29/092 B 22
- LC Class: HV5805.F73 A3 2005
- Followed by: Bright Shiny Morning
- Website: www.bigjimindustries.com

My Friend Leonard is an autobiographical novel written by James Frey. Continuing where A Million Little Pieces left off, the book centers on the father-son relationship Frey develops with Leonard, a friend from the addiction clinic featured in his earlier book.

My Friend Leonard was published in June 2005 by Riverhead, and became a bestseller. Amazon.com editors selected My Friend Leonard as their #5 favorite book of 2005.

As with Frey's previous book, Leonard was marketed as a memoir, but after its release large parts of the story were cast into doubt, and the author later admitted that he had never actually been incarcerated as claimed in the book.

== Summary ==
The novel begins with Frey's release from an Ohio county jail. He anxiously drives to Chicago to see his girlfriend, Lilly, whose grandmother has just died. James and Lilly met in rehab (as mentioned in A Million Little Pieces) and Lilly was in a halfway house while James was in jail. Upon arriving in Chicago, James is informed by the director of the halfway house that Lilly committed suicide because she could not deal with the pain of losing her grandmother.

Desperate, James goes to a liquor store and buys the cheapest bottle of wine with the intention of drinking it. He spends the night in his car and does not drink the alcohol. James asks Leonard for thirty thousand dollars, which he uses to bury Lilly and her grandmother. Leonard had told James while they were in the treatment center that he would look out for James as though he were his son. He gives the money to James on two conditions: 1) James must agree to tell Leonard later what he did with the money, and 2) if James does decide to drink the bottle of wine (which he still keeps in his apartment), he must agree to call Leonard beforehand. Leonard goes into hiding and James does not hear from him for eighteen months. Finally, Leonard meets with James in San Francisco and they reconcile their relationship.

James must handle great adversity throughout the entire novel. He has to deal with people who aren't always reputable. And he battles with depression, but slowly grows from his experiences. This book carries on with the stream of consciousness-style narrative used in the popular and controversial book "A Million Little Pieces".

The rest of the novel deals with James' attempting to create a normal life for himself, and his learning how to deal with successes and failures outside of prison and rehab.
