= Kim: Empty Inside =

2002 young adult novel by Beatrice Sparks

Kim: Empty Inside: The Diary of an Anonymous Teenager
- First edition
- Author: Beatrice Sparks
- Language: English
- Genre: young adult coming-of-age
- Publisher: HarperTeen
- Publication date: 2002
- Publication place: United States
- ISBN: 9780380814602 (mass market paperback edition)
- OCLC: 47289478

Kim: Empty Inside: The Diary of an Anonymous Teenager (generally referred to as just Kim: Empty Inside) is a 2002 young adult psychological coming-of-age novel by Beatrice Sparks, written as the "true" diary of Kim, a teenage gymnast who has anorexia, bulimia and self-deprecating fatphobia in a struggle for self-control (the diary was, in fact, a fiction novel, with Kim created by Beatrice Sparks herself). The book was released by Avon and HarperTeen, and received positive reviews from critics. It was Sparks's first published book on the subject of eating disorders.

== Plot ==
Kim is a teenage girl involved in gymnastics. She has severe self-esteem issues stemming from her early childhood onward, and often thinks of herself in deprecating ways, calling herself a "grunt, grunt, pig" and always comparing herself to her beautiful older twin sisters. Kim is rather immature and often relies on her parents for everything, which also leads to feelings that she has no self-control. She develops anorexia and bulimia in order to stop feeling fat, but also to feel that she has control over some aspect of her life. Kim starts college and dates her first serious boyfriend, both events complicated by her worsening disorder. When she realizes that she has a problem due to her deteriorating physical health, she enters a therapy program and attempts to recover, while also addressing her internalized self-hatred and feelings of perfectionism. Meanwhile, Kim's coach keeps encouraging her to lose more weight so she'll perform in gymnastics better, which would lead to her achieving her dream of attending a UCLA gymnastics program. Kim has to reckon with this and determine for herself whether or not her coach is actually supporting her, or hindering her.

== Structure ==
Like most of Beatrice Sparks's "diary" books, Kim: Empty Inside is written in shorter and longer sporadic diary entries by date, from a first-person perspective of the main protagonist. The original HarperTeen paperback featured a minimalist artwork design of silhouettes of a girl in blue and white colours.

== Reception ==
Kim: Empty Inside received positive reviews from critics. The book was commended initially as an "excellent" resource for child and adolescent mental health. This was further supported by some critical reviewers, such as Alex Yonkovig of TeenInk, who said of the book, "this novel brings the reader straight into the mind of a young woman with an eating disorder and truly puts a captivating outlook on “Kim’s” life, as we watch her fall deeper and deeper into a depression that she can't seem to shake. The more you read of this book, the more you get involved with her and honestly want her to rid herself of her destructive behavior. I would definitely recommend this book to anyone who is interested in taking on a career as a psychologist as well as teenagers who are interested in the way that the brain works. This book was appropriate for all age groups, including pre-teenagers." Reviewer Su Terry of Metapsychology Journal agreed, saying, "Through the use of journaling, the book illustrates the slow but steady change in the thinking of an individual with an eating disorder. The changes and her growing obsession is slow and subtle. This is what makes it so believable. (The “Question and Answers” section at the end of the book describes characteristics for anorexia and for bulimia)".
