= Bright Shiny Morning =

2008 novel by James Frey

- Author: James Frey
- Language: English
- Genre: Fiction
- Publisher: HarperCollins
- Publication date: May 13, 2008
- Publication place: United States
- Media type: Print (hardback & paperback)
- ISBN: 978-0-06-157313-2
- OCLC: 179826273
- Dewey Decimal: 813/.6 22
- LC Class: PS3606.R488 B75 2008

Bright Shiny Morning is a novel written by James Frey, published in 2008. Set in Los Angeles, it follows the lives of several characters: a married couple, both celebrities, named Amberton and Casey; a young couple, Maddie and Dylan; a Mexican-American maid named Esperanza; a homeless man of Venice named Old Man Joe. The novel not only traces the lives of these main characters but also includes "mini-profiles" of other minor characters as well as facts concerning the county of Los Angeles.

Frey and Terry Richardson published a companion photo-book Wives, Wheels, Weapons excerpting three stories from the novel.

== Reception ==
The novel received a good review in The New York Times, which described James Frey as follows: “He got another chance. Look what he did with it. He stepped up to the plate and hit one out of the park… He became a furiously good storyteller this time.” One reviewer wrote: “Bottom line: If, despite the scandal, you loved A Million Little Pieces, you might want to devour Bright Shiny Morning. Like its author, it can be called many things, but never boring. Or timid.”

The New York Observer called it a “page turner” but also stated that Frey “leads you into the hills high above Hollywood, shows you the most spectacular view of the hideousness that is Los Angeles, and then abandons you to make the only choice you can: to jump.”

On August 2, 2008, The Guardian says "Irvine Welsh is entranced by James Frey's tale of redemption - 'the literary comeback of the decade'. James Frey is probably one of the finest and most important writers to have emerged in recent years."

Other reviews were less positive, with the novel described in one review as “the bastard child of a short-story collection and an almanac.” The Los Angeles Times called it “an execrable novel, a literary train wreck without even the good grace to be entertaining.”
