= Michael Croucher =

- Born: Michael John Croucher; January 17, 1930; Maidstone, Kent, England
- Died: May 26, 2006 (aged 76)
- Education: Royal College of Music
- Occupation: Documentary filmmaker

Michael John Croucher (17 January 1930 – 26 May 2006) was a British documentary film maker and television producer for the BBC.

== Life ==
Born in Maidstone, Kent, he was educated at Cranbook school. His education there was interrupted when he was evacuated to Saskatchewan in Canada during the Second World War. In 1949, he undertook National Service in the Royal Air Force, before studying at the Royal College of Music.

He married the writer and actor Rosalind Gee in 1955, and had two sons and one daughter with her. After his divorce from Rosalind, he was married to the artist Anne Adamson from 1979 to his death in May 2006. They had two daughters.

== Career ==
He started work in 1954 as a trainee sound technician at the BBC in Plymouth, where he made use of his experience in wireless telegraphy. After moving to BBC Bristol in 1958, he was able to transfer his sound editing skills to television, and began to work on short documentary pieces on magazine programmes.

He made short filmed documentary programmes, notably The Bashers about a boys' gang in the Lawrence Hill area of Bristol, and then worked on programmes with John Betjeman. Croucher became assistant director to John Boorman, and they worked together on the series Citizen 63 and The Newcomers. With Boorman, he pioneered the approach of "filming ordinary people telling their extraordinary stories straight to camera." After Boorman began working on cinema films, Croucher became head of documentaries at Bristol, and produced a series of films with largely rural settings, including The Curious Character of Britain, Summer 67, The Way of the Warrior, Seven Ages of Man, and Leap in the Dark. He produced the semi-fictionalised Diary of Anne Hughes (1978) of which it was said he was proud of. He produced many one-off films, and the series The French Way, The Italian Way, The Yugoslavian Way, and The Irish Way. In technical work, he pioneered techniques of colour separation.

He left the BBC in 1989, and in later years was a visiting lecturer at Bristol University in the drama department. He died May 26, 2006, aged 76.
