= Boy at War =

Book by Harry Mazer

A Boy at War
- A Boy at War; A Boy No More; Heroes Don't Run
- Author: Harry Mazer
- Cover artist: Paul Zakris (1); Debra Sfetsios (2–3)
- Country: United States
- Language: English
- Genre: Historical; Young adult fiction
- Publisher: Simon & Schuster Children's Publishing
- Published: April 3, 2001 – February 6, 2007
- Media type: Print

The Boy at War trilogy is a series of young adult historical novels by Harry Mazer. The first book, A Boy at War was released on April 3, 2001 and is based on the events of the attack on Pearl Harbor that initiated the United States' involvement in World War II. The books follow Adam Pelko, the son of a navy commander stationed at Pearl Harbor, during the Japanese attack of December 7, 1941.

== Synopsis ==
Adam Pelko, son of a naval commander Lieutenant Pelko is forced to move to Honolulu because his father is reassigned to Pearl Harbor. Adam is enrolled at Honolulu High School which frustrates Adam as people at Honolulu High School have a dislike of military kids. However, Adam does manage to make two friends, Davi Mori and Martin Kahahawai. Davi is a Japanese-American, while Martin is a Native Hawaiian. One day the boys decide to go fishing early in the morning at Pearl Harbor. As they are fishing on the land, they find a rowboat and decide to take it out into the water. They hear airplanes flying overhead and Davi cheers because he believes these are American planes, but Adam sees they're really Japanese, soon their rowboat explodes, and a piece of wood penetrates Martin’s chest. He is wounded, but doesn’t die. Adam watches as his father's ship, the Arizona, goes down and sinks. Once the Japanese attackers leave the harbor in the morning, Adam runs home with a rifle and makes sure his mother and sister, Bea, are okay. They let Adam in the house, and he tells them what happened and that he doesn’t know if his father, Lt. Emory Pelko, is dead or alive. About a week after Adam arrives back home, the family gets a telegram saying the Lt. Emory Pelko is missing. The family wants to move back to the mainland but Adam wants to stay in Hawaii. Eventually, Adam moves back to the mainland with his family.

== Reception ==
Critical reception for the Boy at War series has been mixed to positive, with Booklist and Publishers Weekly both giving the first book starred reviews. Kirkus Reviews panned the first novel, saying that the writing had a "stilted, wooden quality" and that Mazer "does not effectively involve the reader with the requisite emotional intensity or dramatic narrative".

Reception for the second book, A Boy no More was more positive, with Stone Soup calling it "a captivating story about history that we should remember".

=== Awards ===
In 2007 Mazer received a Nēnē Children's Choice Book Award for A Boy at War.
