= Harry Mazer =

American writer

- Born: May 31, 1925; New York, New York
- Died: April 7, 2016 (aged 90); Montpelier, Vermont
- Occupation: Novelist
- Writing career
- Genre: Historical fiction
- Subjects: Writing and ELA

Harry Mazer (May 31, 1925 in New York City – April 7, 2016 in Montpelier, Vermont) was an American writer of books for children and young adults, acclaimed for his "realistic" novels. He has written twenty-two novels, including The Solid Gold Kid, The Island Keeper, Heroes Don't Run, and Snow Bound (the latter of which was adapted as a Special Treat for NBC), as well as one work of poetry and a few short stories.

After attending the Bronx High School of Science Mazer served in World War II in the U.S. Army Air Force from 1943 to 1945. He became a sergeant, and he received a Purple Heart and an Air Medal with four bronze oak leaf clusters after his B-17 bomber was shot down over Czechoslovakia in April 1945. His wartime experiences eventually inspired several works of historical fiction, including The Last Mission and the Boy at War series (A Boy at War, A Boy No More, and Heroes Don't Run). After returning to the U.S., Mazer went to Union College, where he earned a BA in 1948. From 1950 to 1955 he was a railroad brakeman and switchtender for New York Central. He was an English teacher in upstate New York at the Central Square School for a year, in 1959. In 1960 he received a M.A. from Syracuse University.

He has won numerous awards including several 'Best Books' designations from the American Library Association, The Knickerbocker Award from the New York Library Association (2001), and The ALAN Award for Contributions to Young Adult Literature (2003).

Mazer co-authored three books with his late wife, Norma Fox Mazer. He is the father of author Anne Mazer.
