= Ellen Potter =

American author of both children's and adults' books

- Born: 1960 (age 65–66)
- Education: Binghamton University
- Writing career
- Pen name: Ellen Toby-Potter

Ellen Potter (born 1960) is an American author of both children's and adults’ books (as Ellen Toby-Potter). She grew up in Upper West Side, New York City and studied creative writing at Binghamton University and now lives in Candor in upstate New York. She has been a contributor to Cimarron Review, Epoch, The Hudson Review, and Seventeen. Her novel Olivia Kidney was winner of the Child Magazine Best Book award and was a Best Book of the Year selection for 8-12 year-olds by Parenting magazine.

Kirkus Reviews describer book the Humming Room as, "The characters and events are nearly exact counterparts to those found in the classic The Secret Garden. An homage to a cherished classic that can work as a companion piece or stand alone as a solid, modern tale for young readers in the 21st century."

== Publications ==
=== For children ===
- The Kneebone Boy (2010) (Square Fish) ISBN 0-312-67432-5 - "...the story is fresh, funny and surprising. A quirky charmer."
- The Humming Room (2012) (Feiwel & Friends) ISBN 0-312-64438-8
- Otis Dooda (2013) illustrated by David Heatley, Feiwel & Friends, ISBN 9781250011763
- Otis Dooda: Downright Dangerous (2014), illustrated by David Heatley, Feiwel & Friends, ISBN 9781250011770
- Piper Green and the Fairy Tree (2015), illustrated by Qin Leng, Alfred Knopf, ISBN 9780553499230 - "With its intriguing setting, sympathetic characters, and hint of magic, this new chapter-book series should charm fledgling readers."

Illustrated by Peter H. Reynolds and published by Philomel Books:

- Olivia Kidney,(2003) ISBN 0-399-23850-6
- Olivia Kidney and the Exit Academy, (2005) ISBN 0-399-24162-0

renamed as Olivia Kidney Stops for No One

- Pish Posh (2006) ISBN 0-399-23995-2
- Olivia Kidney and the Secret Beneath the City (2007) ISBN 0-399-24701-7
- SLOB (2009)

With co-author Anne Mazer, and illustrated by Matt Phelan:

- Spilling Ink: A Young Writer's Handbook (2010) (Flashpoint) ISBN 1-59643-628-X

=== For adults (as Ellen Toby-Potter) ===
- The Average Human (2003) ISBN 1-931561-33-8 - "A fairly intricate tale that manages not to trip itself up, crisply narrated with a minimum of digression and a remarkable understatement that draws you into the action."
