= The Final Testament of the Holy Bible =

2011 novel by James Frey

- Author: James Frey
- Language: English
- Genre: Fiction
- Publisher: Gagosian Gallery
- Publication date: April 22, 2011
- Publication place: United States
- English publication date: April 22, 2011
- Pages: 400
- ISBN: 1-935263-26-9

The Final Testament of the Holy Bible is a novel written by James Frey, published by Gagosian Gallery in 2011. The book is published in the UK by John Murray with the shortened title The Final Testament (ISBN 9781848543195).

== Reception ==
Michael Lindgren of The Washington Post gave the book a generally positive review, calling it a "strong and absorbing piece of writing" that "moves to its own inner spirit," and describing Frey's prose as having "undergone a miraculous transformation of its own... [with] an exceptionally expressive range of voice."
