= The Diary of a Farmer's Wife 1796–1797 =

The Diary of a Farmer's Wife 1796–1797, also known as Anne Hughes' Diary, was first published in instalments in the Farmers Weekly in 1937–1938, and was subsequently reprinted in book form. It purports to be the diary of a farmer's wife, Anne Hughes, written in England in 1796–1797, which recounts details of her daily life, including recipes, and interactions with her family, servant and friends. There is much uncertainty about the origins of the diary, and it is at least possible that it is a "modern fiction", or at best a semi-fictional extrapolation of a now-lost original, although some have regarded it as providing genuine insights into the world of a late 18th-century farming community.

== Origins of the publication ==
The diary came to public knowledge through writer Jeanne Preston (born Sarah Jane Keyte, 1884–1952). According to the foreword written by Michael Croucher to the 1980 book version, the original diary, referred to at the time as Anne Hughes' Boke (or Anne Hughes, Her Boke), was owned by Anne Hughes' daughter, Mary Anne Thomas (née Hughes). When elderly, she read it to a young friend, Sarah Jane Keyte, who lived on a farm in Herefordshire (possibly Manor Farm at Ballingham) around 1896, and also wrote down some of the stories told to her by Mary Anne Thomas. She later described Mary Anne Thomas as having been a nurse to her own mother's family. The placenames mentioned in the diary – Gloucester, Hereford, and Chepstow – are generally consistent with it having been written in the southern Herefordshire area, but research into the people named in the diary has failed to identify any of the individuals.

Keyte married a farmer, Frank Preston, in 1905, and wrote articles in the 1930s for the Farmers Weekly under the name Jeanne Preston. According to Croucher, when asked by the editor, Mary Day, to produce a regular series of articles:

... Jeanne thought of Anne Hughes and assembled her various sources which included Anne Hughes' Boke and the notes she had taken herself when a girl. It could well be that she decided to present it in the form of a diary rather than as a series of disconnected incidents, or it is possible that the original was actually in diary form into which Jeanne then arranged all her stories. One source for some, but not all, of the recipes was a thick old book that had belonged to Jeanne's mother, Mary Keyte. None of the original work can now be found...

According to Mary Day, the diary was published as submitted by Jeanne Preston, though some repetitious material was removed and some archaic spellings were corrected.

Frank and Jeanne Preston lived in Sarsden, Oxfordshire. She claimed that the original Anne Hughes' Boke was in her possession until, in 1944 during the Second World War, it was lent to an American serviceman, known only as Jack, who was stationed in that area, and was then lost after his unit was mobilised. Sarah Jane (Jeanne) Preston died in Sussex in 1952.

== Later editions and treatments ==
The 1964 book edition of the Diary was prepared for publication by Suzanne Beedell, who was Mary Day's successor as the editor of Farmers Weekly. Both Jeanne Preston and Mary Day had already died, and it was assumed that the book transcription was both genuine and out of copyright. However, after the book had been published by Countrywide Books, Jeanne's daughter, Mollie Preston, successfully claimed the copyright on behalf of her mother's estate "on the grounds that it was not simply a copy, but that her mother had added to it". The book was re-published in 1965.

On Christmas Day 1978, a dramatised version of the book, Anne Hughes' Diary, produced by Michael Croucher, was broadcast by BBC Television. The book was republished by Allen Lane in 1980, and in a Penguin paperback the following year. A further edition, with a rewritten introduction by Croucher, was published by the Folio Society, as Anne Hughes, Her Boke. At that time, a number of reviewers agreed that the book was a hoax, or faked.

In 1992, Penguin Books republished the diary with a new introduction by researchers Adele Davey and Frances Houghton. The same year, an audio version of the book was published. A further book edition, produced in collaboration with Jeanne Preston's grandson, was published with a new introduction in 2009, by the Good Life Press. Research into the origin of the diary, and the whereabouts of the supposed original, has been undertaken by Davey, Houghton and Ian Shankland. It was published as an introduction to the 2009 edition and has been updated on the dedicated Anne Hughes' Diary website.

== See also ==
- List of fictional diaries
