= Nasdijj =

American writer

Timothy Patrick Barrus, also known as Tim Barrus (born 1950), is an American author and social worker who is best known for having published three "memoirs" between 2000 and 2004 under the pseudonym Nasdijj, by which he presented himself as a Navajo. The books were critically acclaimed, and Nasdijj received several literary awards and recognition from major institutions.

In 2006, journalists revealed that Barrus had published the Nasdijj books under a fictional identity, and that the events depicted in all three were largely fiction. In the United States publishing world, Barrus' work is cited as an example of memoirs released under misleading pretenses. The deception was revealed in the same period as the James Frey scandal. Controversy arose over the portrayal of fictional accounts as memoirs, as well as authors presenting false personas. Native Americans strongly criticized Barrus for appropriating the historic suffering of their people. They criticized the publishing world for so readily accepting impostors.

In the 1980s and 1990s, Barrus had published numerous articles and several novels. He is credited by Jack Fritscher with coining the term "Leather Lit."

== Early life and education ==
Tim Barrus was born and grew up in Lansing, Michigan, where he attended public schools. His parents were European American: his father Maynard Barrus worked as a foreman at the power plant. His mother Jean Anne Steginga was of Scandinavian descent. He has a younger sister, Suzanne.

Marrying at a young age, Barrus took a variety of jobs and lived in different regions of the country in his early years. He attended community college in Largo, Florida and started writing in the early 1970s, although he did not publish anything for years.

== Marriage and family ==
At the age of 19, Barrus married Jan Abbott, from a nearby town. Together they have a daughter named Kree, born in 1974. In 1975 they adopted Tommy, a boy who Barrus said had severe developmental problems. After two years, they turned him back to the state, finding they were unable to care for him adequately. Barrus and Jan later separated and divorced. He moved to San Francisco and later Key West.

Barrus remarried in 1993, in San Francisco, to a special education teacher named Tina Giovanni. She has worked with autistic children for 20 years.

== Work life ==
Barrus was a "provocative associate editor" of Drummer Magazine for five issues (#117-122). An editorial by the publishers on his departure explained that they were impressed with the work that he had done, and regretted that "Justice Department persecution of publishers of erotica" had caused him to terminate the relationship. Jack Fritscher (editor in chief) described Barrus as "one of the best editors" the magazine had in the 1980s. Barrus subsequently worked as an editor at Knights Press, creating the LeatherLit Writers Series.

By his account in later interviews, Barrus moved into social work, serving "special-needs children in Florida, Apache kids in New Mexico, disabled adults in Michigan", and autistic children in San Francisco. In 1996, he and his wife Tina moved from Ft. Lauderdale, Florida to a Bureau of Indian Affairs School at Mariano Lake, New Mexico.

This period inspired his persona as Nasdijj. He has said this Navajo word means "to become again", according to an 1890s text. Irvin Morris, a full-blood Navajo and professor of literature and Navajo studies at Dine College, in 2006 said there was no such word in the language. "he became again" is, however, násdlį́į́', which Barrus may have misread as Nasdijj.

== Literary career as Barrus ==
Barrus began publishing articles in the late 1970s, primarily for the gay leather magazine Drummer. After his move to Key West in 1984, he also wrote for The Weekly News, a local gay newspaper.

From 1985 to 1992, he published five novels, all dealing with homosexuality in different genres. While some were favorably reviewed, he never broke into mainstream acceptance. His novel Genocide was recognized as an early contribution to AIDS literature, described by critic Toby Johnson as "dark and pessimistic".

In connection with Anywhere, Anywhere, a novel about Americans in Vietnam during the war, Barrus said that he had been a Vietnam veteran. This account was disputed by people who knew him. He also published numerous articles, reviews and other short pieces.

== Literary career as Nasdijj ==
In 1999, Barrus submitted an unsolicited manuscript to Esquire magazine under the byline Nasdijj; he noted to them that the magazine had never published a work by a Native American author. "Nasdijj" wrote that his essay was about the death of his adopted son from fetal alcohol syndrome (FAS), and that he also had it. His essay, "The Blood Runs Like a River Through My Dreams", was published in Esquire in 1999 and was a finalist in the National Magazine Awards that year.

The following year Nasdijj published this and other non-fiction essays collected as a book under the same name. Receiving widespread notice and praise, the collection was selected as a "Notable Book of the Year" by The New York Times, and sold 27,000 copies. Nasdijj's work received critical acclaim, and his first book was a finalist for the PEN/Martha Albrand Award and winner of the Salon Book Award.

In a 2002 PEN Forum, in which authors were asked to describe "literary lineage", Nasdijj responded,

My literary lineage is Athabaskan. I hear Changing Woman in my head. I listen to trees, rocks, deserts, crows, and the tongues of wind. I am Navajo and the European things you relate so closely to often simply seem alien and remote. I do not know them.

As Nasdijj, Barrus received widespread recognition as a writer on the Native American experience. His work was described as a compelling combination of poetry and prose. His second Navajo memoir, The Boy and the Dog Are Sleeping (2003), won the 2004 PEN American Center's PEN/Beyond Margins Award. In the specialist Native American journal, Studies in American Indian Literatures (SAIL), Marijo Moore wrote,

Nasdijj has shed his blood that runs like a river through his dreams. Spilled it all over the pages of this book so that others might relate. Raw, poignant, poetic, and painful, Nasdijj's style of writing is refreshing.

Barrus published the following books under the name Nasdijj:

- The Blood Runs Like a River Through My Dreams (2000),
- The Boy and the Dog Are Sleeping (2003), and
- Geronimo's Bones: A Memoir of My Brother and Me (2004)

Published as non-fiction, each memoir recounted purported aspects of the author's life. The memoirs referred to his Navajo heritage, his self-destructive and abusive parents (a white father and Navajo mother), his unhappy childhood as a migrant worker, his dysfunctional relationships with other family members, and his growing up to become a nurturing father. As an adult, he adopted two children: one with fetal alcohol syndrome (FAS) and a second who was HIV-positive. In the books, the children are unprotected; the author attacks white society for their plight. One academic study describes the world of the novels as one "in which almost everyone encountered is damaged, brutalized, crippled from beatings, or fatally diseased, and in which mining and other forms of exploitation have permanently crippled the land."

== Hoax controversy ==
Interested in The Boy for its portrayal of fatherhood, in 2004 James Dowaliby, a former vice president for Paramount International Television Group, acquired the film rights from Nasdijj. By the end of 2004, he had approval from FilmFour of the United Kingdom to develop a feature-length adaptation. During the process, he began to suspect the book was fraudulent when an adviser identified numerous errors, including the portrayal of Navajo clans and kinship system.

In January 2006, the journalist Matthew Fleischer published "Navahoax", an article in the LA Weekly, documenting Nasdijj as an ethnic European American named Timothy Patrick "Tim" Barrus. Fleischer provided details about Barrus' parents, marriages and other writings. The article noted that Barrus was known as the author of fiction relating to gay sado-masochism. Fleischer said that suspicions about Nasdijj had arisen with publication of his first book; Sherman Alexie, a respected author of the Spokane tribe, said that he had complained to Anton Mueller, Nasdijj's editor, that the author had plagiarized him and other Native Americans. Alexie also wrote to Houghton Mifflin, which published the first book but then dropped Nasdijj as an author. Dowaliby dropped his film project because of his belief that the work was false.

Extensive media coverage followed the article's publication. A former literary agent for Nasdijj, while not confirming the LA Weekly article, called it "well researched and highly persuasive." News & Observer, a North Carolina newspaper that had published some of Nasdijj's work, confirmed that it had on file a social security number that matched that of Tim Barrus. Esquire magazine revealed that it had paid for a 1999 Nasdijj article with a check made out to "Tim Nasdijj Barrus".

In "Nasdijj Shops Tell-All", Fleischer noted these developments. He quoted an e-mail from Nasdijj to an editor at Penguin Books, in which the author offered a novel called Year of the Hyena: The Story of Nasdijj. The article presented excerpts from Nasdijj's blog with the headline, "Deserving Death for Evil Deeds, by Tim Barrus". It quoted, "What you want to believe you want to believe. If I am the devil incarnate then I am the devil incarnate." Subsequently, the host TypePad deleted Nasdijj's blog.

Sherman Alexie (Spokane-Coeur d'Alene), commented publicly on the controversy. In an article published in the January 29, 2006 issue of Time magazine, Alexie wrote:

So why should we be concerned about his lies? His lies matter because he has cynically co-opted as a literary style the very real suffering endured by generations of very real Indians because of very real injustices caused by very real American aggression that destroyed very real tribes.

He had become suspicious of Nasdijj, finding that the author appeared to borrow from his and other Native American writings. Asked by Alexie to review the books by Nasdijj, Morris found numerous errors that led him to believe the author was an impostor. He did not pursue the matter; as he said,

I have always been bothered by the false claim to the Dine identity by Nasdijj, but if I spent my time tracking down every white writer pretending to be Navajo, I’d have no time left to do anything else.

The author and critic David Treuer (Ojibwe) described Barrus' actions as "harmful cultural fraud." The activist Suzan Shown Harjo (Muscogee Creek and Cheyenne) questioned why the publishing world was taken in by Native American impostors. She said, "There should be a law for the Navajo Nation to sue Barrus for the profits he made while committing the crime of stealing tribal identity." (She has also been critical of Ward Churchill, who as a professor of ethnic studies claimed to be Native American and acts as a spokesman. Harjo and others have documented that he has no record of Native American ancestry.)

Barrus' hoax gained attention for occurring at the same time as other literary scandals: the writer James Frey was found to have made up portions of works published as memoirs, and the purported author JT LeRoy was revealed as a deception created by three people: a woman who performed as the young man in public appearances, and a woman and man who wrote "his" published works. None was the teenage boy from a poor background who was represented in interviews and the works. One journalist noted that "the convergence of all three scandals at once had the feel of a Triple Crown of hoaxery, with the grand losers being accuracy, truth, and literature itself."

Fleischer said that, writing under his pseudonym, Barrus had described the cost of such appropriation:

In an essay on Louis L’Amour titled "The Saddest Book I Ever Read", Nasdijj writes, "The accumulated weight of fictions (like L'Amour's), when added up, form a place that never was and a time that never happened. Fictions like this are murderous. They pass off illusion as fact, stereotype as portraiture... Counterfeit comes to be seen as the genuine article. It kills people. It kills culture. It kills even the shadow of truth."

== After "Nasdijj" ==
After the scandal broke, J. Peder Zane, the News & Observer's book-review editor, who had published some of Nasdijj's work and promoted his writing, reflected,

I felt no sense of betrayal. I knew it wasn't personal. Barrus hadn't conned me; I had just drifted into the black hole of his life, which sucked the trust out of everything within reach.

In May 2006, Esquire published the article "Nasdijj", for which the journalist Andrew Chaikivsky interviewed Barrus. Chaikivsky describes a man whose "shifting emotional temperature" veered between "meticulousness and careful good manners" and "a full roar." Barrus was quoted as saying, "I understand that a trust was violated. I'm not defending it." In the course of the interviews, Barrus spoke of knowing Robert Mapplethorpe, being encouraged to write by Tennessee Williams, and adopting a developmentally challenged child with his first wife during the mid-1970s. Chaikivsky said, "Over the three days I spend with Barrus, I don't believe much of what he tells me." The adoption was documented, as was Barrus and his wife returning the child to the state, which he said was because of the boy's severe problems caused by FAS.

In May 2007, Virginia Heffernan reported in the Screens blog of The New York Times that Barrus had "found a home on YouTube", where he was posting "Nuyorican beat-style stuff", which she described as "irritable, pretty, autodidactic, engrossing."

== Bibliography ==
=== As Tim Barrus ===
- Mineshaft. Knights Press, 1984
- My Brother My Lover. Gay Sunshine, 1985. ISBN 978-0-917342-08-0
- Anywhere, Anywhere. Knights Press, 1987. ISBN 978-0-915175-21-5
- Genocide The Anthology. Knights Press, 1988. ISBN 978-0-915175-28-4
- Selective Service (with Robert McCartney-Moore). Knights Press, 1991. ISBN 978-0-915175-39-0
- To Indigo Dust. Knights Press, 1992. ISBN 978-0-915175-41-3

=== As Nasdijj ===
- The Blood Runs Like a River Through My Dreams (2000)
- The Boy and the Dog Are Sleeping (2003)
- Geronimo's Bones: A Memoir of My Brother and Me (2004).

== Honors ==
- 1999, essay published in Esquire was finalist for National Magazine Award
- 2000, Salon Book Award and The New York Times "Notable Book of the Year," and finalist for the PEN/Martha Albrand Award
- 2004, received the PEN/Beyond Margins Award

== See also ==
- Pretendian
- Misery literature
- Fake memoir
- Plagiarism
- A Gay Girl in Damascus
