= Norma Fox Mazer =

American author and teacher (1931-2009)

- Born: Norma Fox; May 15, 1931; New York City, U.S.
- Died: October 17, 2009 (aged 78); Montpelier, Vermont, U.S.
- Occupation: Author
- Spouse: Harry Mazer (m. 1950)
- Children: 4
- Writing career
- Genres: Children's, young adult
- Notable awards: Edgar Award (Taking Terri Mueller); Lewis Carroll Shelf Award (Dear Bill, Remember Me?); Newbery Honor (After the Rain)

Norma Fox Mazer (née Fox; May 15, 1931 – October 17, 2009) was an American author and teacher, best known for her books for children and young adults. Her novels featured credible young characters confronting difficult situations such as family separation and death.

She was born in New York City but grew up in Glens Falls, New York, with parents Michael and Jean Garlan Fox. Mazer graduated from Glens Falls High School, then went to Antioch College, where she met Harry Mazer, whom she married in 1950; they had four children, three of whom survived Mazer, one of whom, Anne Mazer, is also a writer. In addition to Antioch, Mazer also studied at Syracuse University. In 2009, she died at the age of 78 from brain cancer.

Mazer began writing professionally as a young mother and for several years she and her husband Harry wrote confessional stories for pulp magazines; they would later write several novels together.

Mazer's books were praised for the intelligence of their dialogue, psychological acumen, and the nuance with which domestic difficulties and tragedies were portrayed in the lives of young people. Rather than offering simple resolutions, her stories charted more complex and sometimes suspenseful paths that followed the characters' growth and self-knowledge.

New York Times Book Review contributor Ruth I. Gordon wrote that Mazer "has the skill to reveal the human qualities in both ordinary and extraordinary situations as young people mature....it would be a shame to limit their reading to young people, since they can show an adult reader much about the sometimes painful rite of adolescent passage into adulthood".

In 1988, Mazer said:

I hesitate to say I'm delivering messages....I'm writing stories and novels. I hope there's an underlying feeling for the reader -- a hope, perhaps a moral. But I'm not preaching. I'm telling stories.

Among the honors Mazer earned for her writing were a National Book Award nomination in 1973,, inclusion on the New York Times Outstanding Books of the Year list in 1976, the Lewis Carroll Shelf Award in 1976 and 1977, an Edgar Award in 1982, German Children's Literature prize in 1982, and a Newbery Medal in 1988.

From 1997 to 2006 Mazer taught in the Master of Fine Arts in Writing for Children & Young Adults Program at Vermont College.
