= Margaret Seltzer =

American writer (born 1975)

Margaret Seltzer (pseudonymously Margaret B. Jones, born 1975) is an American author who is notable for writing a fake memoir about growing up in South Central Los Angeles in February 2008. The book, entitled Love and Consequences: A Memoir of Hope and Survival, chronicled her alleged experiences growing up half white, half Native American as a foster child and Bloods gang member in South Central Los Angeles. Almost immediately after publication, the book was proven to be completely fictitious. Seltzer was revealed to have grown up with her two white biological parents in the San Fernando Valley community of Sherman Oaks. She had also attended Campbell Hall, an Episcopalian day school in the North Hollywood area of Los Angeles.

While promoting the book during radio interviews with WBUR's On Point and NPR's Tell Me More, Seltzer spoke with an African American Vernacular dialect and frequently referred to alleged gang friends as "homies" and "my home girl". The book received a number of prominent reviews in various publications, including The New York Times.

Following the revelation of the deception, the book's publisher, Riverhead Books, recalled all copies of the book and audiobook from booksellers. Amazon and Barnes & Noble pulled the purchase page for the book from their sites, and Riverhead offered refunds to those who purchased it. The hoax was discovered when the publisher was contacted by Seltzer's sister. Speaking to The New York Times, Seltzer later admitted that the personal details of her memoir were fabricated but claimed that some details were based on the real experiences of friends.

== See also ==
- Misery lit
