= Almost Lost =

1996 book by Beatrice Sparks

Almost Lost: The True Story of an Anonymous Teenager's Life on the Streets
- Author: Anonymous (Beatrice Sparks)
- Language: English
- Publisher: Prentice Hall
- Publication date: June 1996
- Publication place: United States
- Media type: Print (Paperback)
- Pages: 140 pp
- ISBN: 978-0-380-78341-0
- OCLC: 34192056
- Dewey Decimal: 616.85/2706/0835 20
- LC Class: RJ506.D4 A46 1996

Almost Lost: The True Story of an Anonymous Teenager's Life is a 1996 young adult novel attributed to Beatrice Sparks, cited as non-fiction by her, but with no viable sources to suggest that the story, the characters, or the narrator are in any way factual. Almost Lost tells the story of Sammy, a runaway teenager who dabbles in rap, the occult, and drugs, and is turned into a happy, wholesome teen by attending therapy with Sparks.

== Major themes ==
Patrick Jones wrote in A Core Collection for Young Adults that Almost Lost is about hope as Sammy manages to leave his "hard life through peace, love, and understanding."

== Reception ==
Almost Lost was criticized by the majority of reviewers. Most agreed that the theme was fairly positive, but that the events described by the book seemed fake. Sandra Doggett from the School Library Journal stated that, "It is hard to imagine that the troubled teenager described in the beginning could change so dramatically so quickly and cure his father's cocaine habit, recover from depression, and restore his parents' marriage." Cindy Lombardo of Voice of Youth Advocates felt that the writing was trite, stilted, and pompous. A reviewer from Publishers Weekly was more positive, stating that Sammy "can be almost astonishingly articulate" as he discloses traumatic incidents from his past. The reviewer felt that "the transcripts shape a clearly defined portrait of an intelligent, determined teen", though some of the patient-therapist conversations "may seem lengthy and repetitious to the general YA reader."
