= From the Files of Madison Finn =

Children's book series

From the Files of Madison Finn is a series of children's books by American writer Laura Dower. They are stories of a seventh grader's life that deal with boys, friends, enemies, and drama, connected with technology. They were first published between 2001 and 2006.

== Summary ==
This series is about a 12-year-old girl named Madison Finn, who lives in the fictional town of Far Hills in New York. Madison is the daughter of Francine and Jeffrey Finn, who are divorced. The series starts shortly after the events of the divorce. Madison is just like any other average 12-year-old girl. She worries about school, her best friends Aimee Gillespie and Fiona Waters, her crush on Hart Jones, and her constant rivalry with former friend, Ivy Daly. To get through it all, she writes files on her computer, which acts as a sort of diary. There are currently 22 books in the series, including three super specials, which are slightly longer than the usual books and deal with certain special events in Madison's life, such as her dad's remarriage. Madison can be mean towards Ivy (and vice versa) in some of the books, but in the end she is a nice, kind, caring, and lovable 12-year-old girl.

== Characters ==
- Madison Finn is the main character of the series. Her favorite color is orange, as she has an orange laptop that she usually carries with her and writes her files on. She likes to write on her laptop of what happened that day. She has a pug named Phineas T. Finn. She lives with her mother who is divorced from her father before the start of the series. She is known to be shy and is not a fan of public speaking, and she shows great care for animals. Later in the series, Madison volunteers at the Far Hills Animal Shelter with Dan Ginsburg. She writes files on her computer, which acts as her diary where she writes about what is currently going on in her life, her parents' divorce, her crush on Hart Jones, and her enemy Ivy Daly. She is described as having normal weight, and has green eyes and brown hair.
- Ivy Daly, nicknamed Poison Ivy by Madison and her friends, is a girl who has red hair and a snobbish attitude, and is enemies with Madison, Aimee, and Fiona. She once is Madison's best friend, but the two soon turn into enemies when Ivy changes after coming back from summer camp, and she suddenly thinks she is better than Madison. She is usually Madison's lab partner, but she rarely does her own work, preferring to copy Madison's. Ivy considers Hart Jones to be her boyfriend early in the series, but it is obvious that he has no feelings for her. She has two best friends, Joan (whom Madison and her friends call "Phony Joanie") and Rose (called Rose Thorn). It is told in book #19, Keep It Real, that Ivy's mother is diagnosed with breast cancer. The status of her mother after is unknown.
- Aimee Gillespie has been friends with Madison ever since they were born (mentioned in book #2, Boy, Oh Boy!). She is thin and blonde, and she loves to dance ballet, stating that she is planning on becoming a professional ballerina when she grows up. She practices daily, sometimes even going before school to practice. She is also very afraid of water: when she is little, she falls in the water and does not come up until a minute after. In book #8, Picture-Perfect, Aimee is diagnosed with anorexia after she faints. She is a committed vegetarian and is always on a diet, constantly believing that she is overweight. She is described as very thin with wavy blonde hair.
- Bigwheels is Madison's keypal. It is revealed that her real name is Victoria, although she prefers to go by Vicki. She and Madison often email one another, telling each other their problems. Later in the series, Madison finds out that Bigwheels' little brother Eddie has autism.
- Fiona Waters moves to Far Hills from California. She has a twin brother named Chet. In book #1, Only the Lonely, Fiona and Madison become friends, but later in the series, she tries to befriend Ivy. At the end, she realizes that Ivy is just plain mean, and she goes back to Madison. She, Madison, and Aimee become close friends in no time, and she is one of Madison's BFFs. She is shown to have an immense talent in soccer. She and Walter "Egg" Diaz both have crushes on one another, and later in the series, they are supposedly called a couple. She is described as having long dark hair, dark skin, and brown eyes.
- Walter "Egg" Diaz is Madison's male friend. He gets his nickname when an egg is thrown at his face when he is younger. Egg is only called Walter by his mom (and Fiona early in the series). It becomes obvious that he and Fiona Waters have a crush on one another, and they are supposedly going out later in the series. He is described as annoying, loud, and loves to make fun of his friends and to pull jokes. He is also the group's computer whiz along with Drew Maxwell. Egg, along with most of the guys in the group, plays hockey, and his mother teaches Spanish at the group's school.
- Hart Jones is Madison's crush throughout the series, and is cousins with Drew Maxwell. At first it is thought that he likes Ivy, but later in the series, it becomes apparent that his crush is on Madison all along. He plays hockey along with most of the guys in the group. He is known to be the cutest boy in seventh grade at Far Hills Junior High (the school where Madison and her friends attend). It is revealed that in second grade, Madison slugged Hart. Like most boys, he enjoys sports, pulling pranks, and skateboarding. He is described as tall and having dark hair, and he sometimes wears glasses. In book #22, All Shook Up, Hart kisses Madison, and they start dating.
- Chet Waters is Fiona Waters' twin brother. He is considered "annoying" by Fiona and the other girls. Chet at first seems to have a crush on Ivy, but later falls for Madison's Indian friend, Madhur, towards the end of the series. In one book, Mrs. Waters announced that she was pregnant.
- Drew Maxwell is Hart's cousin. He is the quiet one of the group, and he is also the richest one of them all. It is evident that Drew likes Madison, despite the fact that he gets a girlfriend in the middle of the series. He also asks Madison to the school's Heart 2 Heart dance, but she immediately turns him down in hopes that Hart would ask her instead. Drew is known for his extremely extravagant parties and for having virtually anything he wants. Despite that, he is very down to earth and does not flaunt his riches.
- Dan Ginsburg is one of Madison's guy friends. In seventh grade, most kids call him "Pork-o" because he eats everyone's food when they are done. He works as a volunteer at the veterinary clinic with Madison. Around the middle of the series, Dan admits to having a crush on Madison and being her secret admirer, but she does not reciprocate his feelings. Later in the series, he ends up with Madison's friend Lindsay Frost instead.
- Lindsay Frost becomes one of Madison's friends in the series. Madison has known her since first grade, but never really knows her well. Lindsay is first featured in book #3, Play It Again, as the girl who has an incredible voice, but is very shy. Her parents are going to be divorced, but it is never mentioned until book #20, All That Glitters. Lindsay admits in that book that she has a crush on Dan Ginsburg.
- Madhur Singh becomes Madison's newest friend at the end of the series. She and her family are from India. Madison has seen her in class, but never knows her until book #22, All Shook Up. Madhur admits to liking Hart Jones, but she gives up on him when she accidentally finds out that Madison and Hart are going out. In the end, she ends up with Chet Waters, Fiona's twin brother.
- Carmen is one of the prettiest girls in the whole school. She is described as having brown hair and green eyes, and she likes Hart Jones. Hart is Madison's crush, but later in Picture-Perfect, Madison thinks that Hart likes her better than Madison. Madison describes Carmen as snobby and pretty. She is also in the same class Hart and Madison is in, which is revealed in Picture-Perfect.

== Book titles ==
1. Only the Lonely
2. Boy, Oh Boy!
3. Play It Again
4. Caught in the Web
5. Thanks for Nothing
6. Lost and Found
7. Save the Date
8. Picture-Perfect
9. Just Visiting
10. Give and Take
11. Heart to Heart
12. Lights Out!
13. Sink or Swim
14. Double Dare
15. Off the Wall
16. Three's a Crowd
17. On the Case
18. Give Me a Break
19. Keep It Real
20. All that Glitters
21. Forget Me Not
22. All Shook up

Super Editions

1. To Have and To Hold
2. Hit the Beach
3. Friends 'till the End

Bind Up Books

- 1-3 2C4W* Too Cool For Words
- 4-6 BF4E* Best Friends Forever
