= Anne Mazer =

American novelist (born 1953)

Anne Mazer (born 1953) is the American author of forty-five books, including The Amazing Days of Abby Hayes series encompassing twenty two books, The Salamander Room, and The No-Nothings and Their Baby.

Mazer was born in 1953 in Schenectady, New York. As the daughter of novelists Harry Mazer and Norma Fox Mazer, Mazer loved books and said that she would often sneak out of high school to go to the public library. After high school, she went on to study art, at Syracuse University's School of Visual and Performing Arts. She also studied French language and literature at the Sorbonne in Paris, where she lived for three years. It was in Paris that Mazer began writing, but she didn't consider the picture book form until after the first of her two children was born. Watch Me was her first published work; Moose Street, published two years later, was the first of Mazer's young adult novels.

The Salamander Room was a 1993 ABC Children's Choice book and a Reading Rainbow Feature selection. Among her seven novels, Moose Street was a Booklist Editor's Choice for Best Book of 1992, and The Oxboy was a Notable 1993 Children's Trade Book in the Field of Social Studies and an ALA Notable Book.

Mazer's short stories have been included in anthologies, and she has edited four anthologies for teenage readers, several of which have been named New York Public Library Best Books for Teens. In 2010 she co-authored (with Ellen Potter) Spilling Ink: A Handbook for Young Writers, and was artist in residence at Colgate University.
