= Jay's Journal =

Book by Beatrice Sparks

- Editor: Beatrice Sparks
- Author: Anonymous (edited by Beatrice Sparks)
- Language: English
- Publisher: Simon & Schuster Adult Publishing Group
- Publication date: 1978
- Publication place: United States
- Media type: Print (Hardcover and Paperback)
- Pages: 192 pp
- ISBN: 978-0-671-73559-3
- OCLC: 19817668

Jay's Journal is a 1979 book that was published in a diary format. The book is presented as an autobiographical account of a depressed teenage boy who becomes involved with a Satanic group. After participating in several occult rituals, Jay believes he is being haunted by a demon named "Raul." The book was edited and written by Beatrice Sparks, and is based partly on the life of 16-year-old Alden Barrett from Pleasant Grove, Utah, who died by suicide in 1971. Critics allege Sparks misrepresented Barrett's life and experiences.

== Plot ==
In the mid-to-late 1970s, Jay is a religious, depressed teenager who begins a journal after being persuaded by his Sunday School teachers. He begins writing poetry venting his feelings about conformity, and discusses his parents, whom he frequently gets in trouble with.

Jay begins a relationship with a girl named Debbie. Debbie begins to ask him to get her amphetamines from his father's pharmacy, where he works. He covers up the theft by filling the emptied capsules with powdered milk. Although feeling guilty about what he does, Jay is far too infatuated with Debbie to refuse.

Jay is caught stealing drugs by his father, who fires him. The pharmacy gets into legal trouble, and Jay is sent to a juvenile detention center. Jay expresses regret over his crimes in his journal and reminisces about life before. Debbie writes frequently, but eventually stops writing to him and they break up.

Jay meets Pete, who introduces him to matters relating to the occult. Eventually, Jay claims to witness Pete move a chair with mental powers and make a wart on his finger disappear. He finds himself drawn to Pete, so much so that he is upset when he is informed that he will soon be released from the detention center. However, he realizes he misses his family and anticipates returning home.

He eventually meets a girl named Tina, and they begin dating. Tina is involved with the occult, using witchcraft to influence school elections. She leads him deeper into the occult. Jay and Tina break up over it, but end up back together and form a coven with other friends. The coven increase their occult activity, strangling a kitten and attempting to revive it, attacking cattle, and bathing in blood to baptize themselves. Responding to their unease around the coven's activities, Jay and his best friends start pulling away from the coven. Jay and Tina break up again after Tina reconnects with an old boyfriend.

Jay begins to have visions of a demon named Raul and believes he has been possessed. His best friends both later die in separate car accidents, seemingly linked to the coven's practices. He begins to withdraw from his family and activities. Jay decides to contact his Bishop for help. In his journal, he writes a note to his parents in the form of a will.

The story ends with an epilogue in the form of a letter written by Jay's mother. She writes that they found Jay dead, having killed himself with a gunshot to the head.

== Response ==
Some critics have challenged the authenticity of the story, noting that the editor of this book, Beatrice Sparks, has filled the same role on many other "actual, anonymous diaries of teenagers" that explore such sensational themes as drug addiction, teenage pregnancy, and prostitution. These books, the most well-known of which is Go Ask Alice, serve as cautionary tales.

Alden Barrett was a teenager who died by suicide in 1971. According to a book written by Alden Barrett's brother Scott (A Place in the Sun: The Truth Behind Jay's Journal) and interviews with the Barrett family, Sparks used 21 entries of 212 total from Barrett's actual journal. The other entries were fictional, with Sparks claiming they were based on case histories from other teenagers Sparks worked with and interviews of friends and acquaintances of Barrett.

Within the city of Pleasant Grove, Jay's Journal has been the source of many urban legends, including alleged locations where Jay performed actions described in the book, his home, the effect on his family after his death, and other rumors.

In 2004, a local Salt Lake City paper, City Weekly, ran a story containing interviews with the Barrett family and their friends. Apart from pointing out the book's untruths, its authors assert that, ironically, the book Jay's Journal actually inspired imitative acts of what readers took to be Satanic rituals.

Due to allegations of ritual cattle mutilation arising in Jay's Journal, the book came to the attention of Royal Canadian Mounted Police officers investigating reports of killed and mutilated cows in Alberta.

== Adaptations ==
A rock opera titled A Place in the Sun was created and performed in 1997 and 1998 by Utah band Grain, led by Bryan Hall. According to some of Alden's family members, it was a more accurate portrayal and showed Sparks' alleged exploitation of the story.

In 2022 and 2023, Hall and his band, Bay of Pigs, began live performances of another rock opera telling Alden Barrett's story. It is called Pleasant Grove and was performed as a work-in-progress in Utah at the Springville Utah Rivoli theater in two runs during 2023. The band at the heart of its creation, Bay of Pigs, has plans to continue developing the project for other performances.

== See also ==
- Fake memoir
- Misery literature
- Satanic Panic
