= Michael Pelligrino =

American writer (born 1966)

Michael Pelligrino (born 1966) is a U.S. man who fooled publisher Simon & Schuster into thinking that he was Michael Gambino, grandson of Mafioso Carlo Gambino.

In 1999, Pelligrino was jailed for theft and impersonating an FBI agent. In jail, he contacted literary agent Joel Gotler of the Artist Management Group, a talent agency in Hollywood, and convinced him that he was actually Michael Gambino, the illegitimate grandson of Carlo Gambino.

When he was released in 2001, Gotler sold his story to Pocket Books, a division of Simon & Schuster, for a $500,000 advance.

Pelligrino used a ghostwriter to make a book The Honored Society, a novel that was supposedly based on his own experiences as a gangster. In the book he claimed that he had been 12 years in prison for bribery, gambling, extortion, kidnapping, money laundering, murder and pimping, and had decided to come clean when serving time. The book was published in November 2001. Pelligrino appeared on Good Morning America to promote his book, claiming that he was a son of Carlo Gambino's unknown son Vito, who had been born in Sicily and later immigrated to the United States.

As it happens, Carlo Gambino has a great-grandson named Michael, who lives in New York: Carlo Gambino's son Thomas, upon hearing of these events, instructed his own lawyer Michael Rosen to expose the impostor, and Rosen promptly contacted the publisher to inform them of the fraud.

Simon & Schuster withdrew the book. On August 27, 2002, Simon & Schuster sued Artist Management Group, accusing it of misrepresenting Michael Gambino and demanding return of the money and millions of dollars in damages. Pelligrino's lawyers defended their client by stating that he did believe he was Gambino's grandson and that the book was fiction, not a biography.
