= Fake memoir =

Type of literary forgery

A fake memoir is a type of literary forgery in which a wholly or partially fabricated autobiography, memoir or journal of an individual is presented as fact. In some cases, the purported author of the work is also a fabrication.

Fake memoirs frequently feature claims of overcoming overwhelming issues, such as bereavement, abuse, addiction, poverty, or gang violence. These issues are written about in dramatic, sordid ways, which can make them come across as misery literature. They may also exaggerate or fabricate connections to a minority group or a culturally traumatic event.

== Motives for creating a fake memoir ==
Authors of fake memoirs are aware of the publishing industry's demand for new content. Bigger, stranger, and more frightening stories get more attention from agents, publishers, and audiences. They are able to use their knowledge of writing and publishing to highlight the cultural capital in their fake narratives. The stories use existing notions about cultures, groups, or events to their advantage, as well as the fact that the majority of their audience may not be able or willing to fact-check their claims.

People who belong to the community being impersonated or who know it well often do not detect the hoax. They, too, want to believe in the book: they want successful works to come from their community. Conducting a kind of “criminal investigation” to guess the author's true identity based on the text is difficult.

In her 2012 article The Pornography of Trauma: Faking Identity in 'Misery Memoirs' Alyson Miller argues, that misery memoirs, marketed as both part of the recovery of the abused survivor, and inspiration for the enamoured reader, capitalise on a cultural ethos that celebrates the public confession of victimhood. According to Miller, in the misery-memoir economy, trauma functions as a form of cultural capital. Certain identities — abused child, addict, survivor, victim of systemic neglect — carry moral authority and narrative legitimacy. Claiming such an identity grants the speaker credibility, sympathy, and visibility. When authors fake or exaggerate trauma, they are not just fabricating events; they are appropriating an identity that is culturally sanctioned as "real" and deserving of attention.

Miller writes:

-- anxieties about the connection between representation and truth are mitigated via an emotional connection with the text. While the degree of faking varies, each scandal reveals a cultural anxiety about authenticity and the need to find —or more specifically, feel — something that can be accepted as unquestionably 'true'. Indeed, the mimicking performed by a fake profoundly unsettles the boundaries between fact and fiction to reveal a public investment in an undisturbed effect of the real, a willingness to accept a blurring of 'truth' in the interests of the sensational experience of literature.

Due to scams, publishers have been asked to do more background checks and fact-checking on authors' materials.

Hoaxes are often profitable even after being exposed. If the books are popular, it is often in the interest of the publisher—and even the deceived readers—to continue the pretense. The Education of Little Tree, written by former Ku Klux Klan member Asa Carter posing as a Cherokee orphan named Forrest Carter, is still marketed on the publisher's website as a classic of its era and a timeless book for all ages. James Frey's A Million Little Pieces is described in online bookstores as a celebrated account of Frey's time in rehab.

== Public reception ==
A number of fake memoirs have been published by renowned publishing houses and received critical acclaim only to be exposed as partial or complete fabrications. Fragments: Memories of a Wartime Childhood (Binjamin Wilkomirski), The Blood Runs Like a River Through My Dreams (Nasdijj), Love and Consequences (Margaret Seltzer), and Go Ask Alice (Anonymous) garnered praise from The New York Times before exposed as false. Love and Consequences (Margaret Seltzer) and Odd Man Out (Matt McCarthy) were published by Penguin Group USA. A Million Little Pieces was published by Random House.

Sensational fake memoirs have contributed to moral panics and public misconceptions. Beatrice Sparks, who presented herself as a Mormon youth counselor, published anonymously books marketed as authentic diaries of troubled teenagers, including Go Ask Alice and Jay’s Journal. These stories warned readers about social issues such as drugs, Satanism, and teenage pregnancy. Other influential works, such as Sybil by Flora Rheta Schreiber and Michelle Remembers by Lawrence Pazder, promoted ideas of repressed memories and hidden childhood trauma. Sybil increased public awareness and diagnoses of multiple personality disorder (now called dissociative identity disorder), while Michelle Remembers helped ignite the Satanic panic in the United States. Both books were later challenged for their factual accuracy, with critics arguing they involved exaggeration and deception. Similarly, Laurel Rose Willson fabricated identities as both a Satanic abuse survivor and Holocaust survivor, further exploiting public fears through sensational narratives.

Two authors of fake memoirs, James Frey (A Million Little Pieces), and Herman Rosenblat (who was featured before he wrote Angel at the Fence), as well as an imposter assuming the name Anthony Gody Johnson (A Rock and a Hard Place), appeared on The Oprah Winfrey Show. All eventually had their mendacity made public, and the scheduled publication of Rosenblat's book was cancelled. Frey, accompanied by his editor Nan Talese, was confronted by Oprah during a follow-up episode.

After Raynor Winn's best-selling memoir The Salt Path was revealed to be fabricated in 2025, The Times pointed out the book achieved extraordinary success largely because it was presented as a true account. The publisher Penguin Random House promoted it as "unflinchingly honest", tapping into a long-standing appetite for misery memoirs—stories of hardship overcome whose emotional force depends on the belief that the events really occurred. According to the newspaper, the publisher neglected its duty to dig deeper, and in doing so it purveyed fiction as fact.

== Relationship to fiction ==
Fake memoirs may be rebranded as fiction after the fraud is uncovered. This allows the publishers to benefit from the notoriety the book has obtained. For instance, reissues of Go Ask Alice by Beatrice Sparks disclaim that the book is a work of fiction even when the front cover claims it's the true diary of a teenage drug addict.

Autofiction uses elements of memoir styling and can use real events, but expresses the experiences in an exaggerated, fictitious manner. These books are not intentionally presented as true stories. They may contain elements that reasonable readers would recognize as fiction. Professor Robin Hemley notes “The intertwined histories of the novel and of autobiographical literature suggest that novelists have long had an ambivalent attitude towards fact and fiction.”

Another version of a fictional memoir is a tie-in related to another media property. For instance, Grove Press and the writers of the television show Mad Men released an adaptation of the in-universe memoir Sterling's Gold: Wit and Wisdom of an Ad Man. The real book is a collection of quotes rather than a narrative.

== See also ==
- Autofiction
- List of fictional diaries
- List of impostors
- Beatrice Sparks
- Trauma culture
- Victim playing
