= The Cage (Abraham book) =

2002 book by Tom Abraham

- Author: Tom Abraham
- Language: English
- Publisher: Corgi
- Publication date: 2002
- Publication place: United Kingdom
- Media type: Paperback
- ISBN: 978-0-552-14959-4
- OCLC: 52456437
- LC Class: DS559.5 .A27 2003

The Cage is a 2002 book by Tom Abraham. The work centers on his time spent serving in the United States Army in Vietnam and thereafter, and it caused controversy among veterans of the war when it was revealed that he had never been missing from his unit as claimed in the book.

== Synopsis ==
The book covers the period that Tom Abraham, an Englishman, spent in the US Army during the Vietnam War. It describes how he served as an officer in the 1st Cavalry Unit and was captured by the Vietcong, before escaping and finding his unit again.

The book is divided into four sections, the first is about his time in England, the second is his time in America, the third is his time fighting in the Vietnam War and the final section is about his capture and treatment by his captors.

After the war he claimed to have suffered post-traumatic stress and after being arrested by the police suffered a breakdown.

== Controversy ==
After the book's publication, several Vietnam War veterans expressed concern over the events described in the book, in particular Abraham's supposed capture and imprisonment. The Defence POW-Missing Personnel Office did not list him as a POW and his service record does not list the time spent in captivity either.
