= James Frey =

American writer (born 1969)

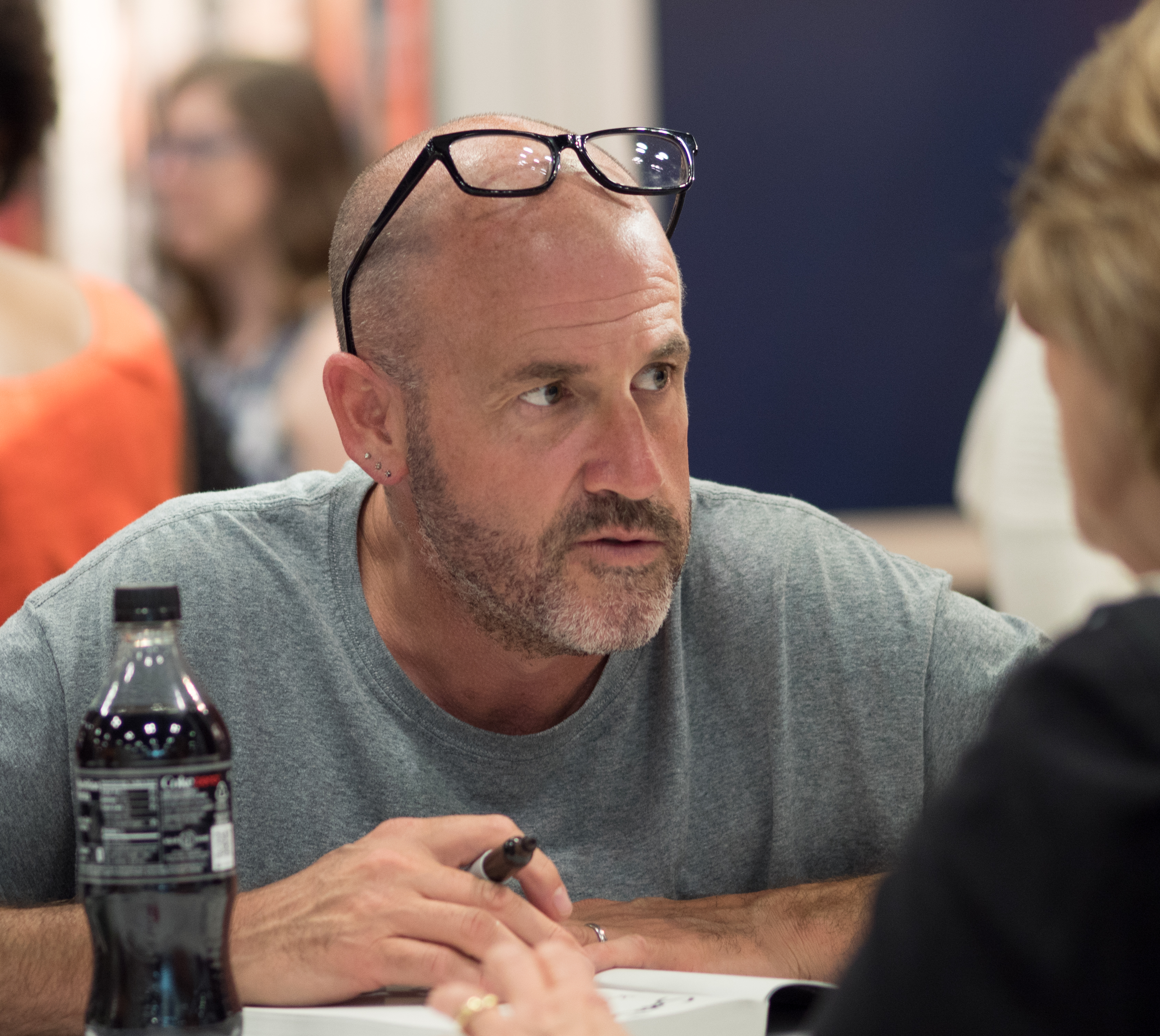
- Frey at the 2018 BookExpo America at the Javits Convention Center in Midtown Manhattan, New York
- Born: James Christopher Frey; September 12, 1969 (age 57); Cleveland, Ohio, U.S.
- Education: Denison University
- Occupations: Writer; media producer
- Writing career
- Notable works: A Million Little Pieces; Lorien Legacies series; Endgame: The Calling series
- Website: bigjimindustries.com

James Christopher Frey (/fraɪ/ FRY; born September 12, 1969) is an American writer and fabulist. His first two books, A Million Little Pieces (2003) and My Friend Leonard (2005), were bestsellers marketed as memoirs. Large parts of the books were later found to be exaggerated or fabricated, sparking a media controversy. His 2008 novel Bright Shiny Morning was similarly a bestseller.

Frey is the founder and CEO of Full Fathom Five. A transmedia production company, FFF is responsible for Lorien Legacies, a young adult adventure/science fiction series of seven books written by Frey and others, under the collective pen name Pittacus Lore. Frey's first book of the series, I Am Number Four (2010), was made into a feature film by DreamWorks Pictures. Frey is also the CEO of NYXL, an esports organization based in Manhattan, New York.

== Background ==
Frey was born in Cleveland, Ohio. He majored in English and film at Denison University in Granville, Ohio.

== Career ==
Frey wrote the screenplays to the films Kissing a Fool (1998) and Sugar: The Fall of the West (1998), the latter of which he directed. Doubleday published A Million Little Pieces in April 2003, which Frey wrote and marketed as a memoir of drug addiction, crime, and an eventual journey to sobriety. Initial reception was mostly positive and Amazon.com editors selected it as their favorite book of the year. He followed it with the sequel My Friend Leonard in 2005. The second book centered on the father-son relationship which Frey formed with his friend Leonard. The two met at a Hazelden addiction treatment program. My Friend Leonard was published in June 2005 by Riverhead Books and was a bestseller. Significant parts of the two books, initially promoted as factual, later were revealed to have been invented by Frey (see § Controversy).

Despite the uproar, Frey signed a new three-book, seven-figure deal in late 2007 with HarperCollins to release a novel Bright Shiny Morning, published May 13, 2008. Bright Shiny Morning appeared on the New York Times bestseller list however it received mixed reviews. The New York Times' Janet Maslin, who had been one of Frey's detractors, gave the book a rave review. In 2011, The Final Testament of the Holy Bible, depicted as "the last book of the Bible" was released on Good Friday, April 22, 2011. Frey self-published e-editions of the book. A self-professed atheist, Frey suggested the work has reflected his attempt to write about a god he "might actually believe in." In August 2012, he published "A Moving Story," chronicling the workplace organizing of a New York moving company, on Libcom, a website. In collaboration with Jocelyn Cohn, he wrote two stories on Libcom: "Against Transparency", questioning the need for budgetary transparency and "Silencing America’s Radical History: Where Do We Go From Here?", critiqued a panel at New School University in Lower Manhattan, New York.

On October 7, 2014, Endgame: The Calling, the first book in a trilogy of novellas by Frey and Nils Johnson-Shelton, was published by HarperCollins. It was turned into an augmented reality game by Google's Niantic Labs, and 20th Century Fox bought the movie rights. The novella is about aliens creating human life on Earth and 12 ancient lines which are destined to train a player to fight to the death for the survival of their line once "Endgame" begins. The book series was said to have clues, which would lead one lucky winner to a cash prize. On November 18, 2015, Frey released "Black Knight Decoded," a fictional narrative imagining a conspiracy involving the Black Knight satellite legend. Frey was credited as the writer. In 2019, he co-developed the story for the film Queen & Slim (2019), which Lena Waithe turned into a screenplay.

== Controversy ==
=== A Million Little Pieces ===
==== Media skepticism ====
On January 8, 2006, The Smoking Gun website published an article called "A Million Little Lies: Exposing James Frey's Fiction Addiction," alleging that Frey made up large parts of his memoirs, including details about his criminal record. An incident in the book which has been particularly scrutinized was a 1986 train–automobile collision in St. Joseph Township, Michigan.

The website said that Frey was never incarcerated and that he had greatly exaggerated the circumstances of a key arrest detailed in the memoir: hitting a police officer with his car, while high on crack, which led to a violent mêlée with multiple officers and an 87-day jail sentence. In the police report which TSG uncovered, Frey was held at a police station for no more than five hours before posting a bond of a few hundred dollars for minor offenses. The arresting officer, according to TSG, recalled Frey as having been polite and cooperative. The book's hardcover (Doubleday) and paperback (Anchor Books, part of Doubleday) publishers initially stood by Frey, but upon examining the evidence, the publishers altered their stances. As a consequence, the publishers decided to include a publisher's note and an author's note from Frey as disclaimers which are included in subsequent publications.

The Minneapolis Star Tribune started to question Frey's claims as early as 2003. Frey responded by saying, "I've never denied I've altered small details." In a May 2003 interview, he claimed that his publisher had fact-checked his first book. On January 11, 2006, Frey appeared with his mother on Larry King Live. He defended his work, claiming that all memoirs alter minor details for literary effect. He consistently referred to the reality of his addiction, which he said was the principal point of his work. Oprah Winfrey called at the end of the show, defending the essence of Frey's book and the inspiration it provided to her viewers, but said she relied on the publisher to assess the book's authenticity.

==== Appearance on The Oprah Winfrey Show ====
On January 26, 2006, as more accusations against the book were made, Winfrey invited Frey onto The Oprah Winfrey Show. She wanted to hear from him directly whether he had lied to her or "simply" embellished minor details, as he had told Larry King. Frey admitted that several of the allegations against him were true. He acknowledged that The Smoking Gun was accurate when the website reported that Frey only spent a few hours in jail rather than the 87 days Frey claimed in his memoirs.

Winfrey then brought out Nan Talese, Frey's publisher, to defend Talese's decision to classify the book as a memoir. Talese said that she had done nothing to check the book's veracity, despite the fact that her representatives had assured Winfrey's staff that the book was indeed non-fiction and said that it was "brutally honest" in a press release. Several columnists weighed in on the controversy including David Carr of the New York Times, New York Times columnist Maureen Dowd, Larry King, and the Washington Post's Richard Cohen.

==== Aftermath ====
On January 31, 2006, it was announced that Frey had been dropped by his literary manager, Kassie Evashevski of Brillstein-Grey Entertainment, over matters of trust. In an interview with Publishers Weekly, Evashevski said that she had "never personally seen a media frenzy like this regarding a book before". On February 1, 2006, Random House published Frey's note to readers, which has been included in later editions of the book. In the note, he apologized for fabricating portions of his book. On February 24, Frey's publicist revealed that Penguin imprint Riverhead Books had dropped a two-book deal with Frey, a deal valued at a purported seven figures. Riverhead previously published his bestselling 2005 book, My Friend Leonard.

On September 12, 2006, Frey and publisher Random House reached a tentative legal settlement, whereby readers who felt that they had been defrauded by Frey's A Million Little Pieces would be offered a refund. In order to receive the refund, customers had to submit a proof of purchase such as pieces of the book itself (page 163 from the hardcover or the front cover from the paperback) and complete a sworn statement indicating that they had purchased the book under the assumption that it was a memoir.

On July 28, 2007, at the Mayborn Literary Nonfiction Writers Conference of the Southwest in Grapevine, Texas, Nan Talese verbally attacked Oprah for misrepresenting the purpose of the interview on January 26, 2006. Right before air time, both Talese and Frey were told the topic of the show had been changed to "The James Frey Controversy". On November 2, 2007, the Associated Press published an article about a judgment in favor of readers who felt deceived by Frey's claims of A Million Little Pieces's being a memoir. Although the publisher, Random House, had set aside $2.35 million for lawsuits, only 1,729 readers came forward to receive a refund for the book. The refund offer was extended to anyone who had purchased the book prior to Frey's disclosing the falsehoods therein. Chicago lawyer Larry D. Drury, who represented the class, received approximately $1.3 million for legal fees, distribution of the legal notice, and charitable donations to three charities, while total claimants' refunds issued to readers came to $27,348. The publisher agreed to provide a disclosure at the beginning of the book, citing the somewhat fictitious nature of the text.

In May 2009, Vanity Fair reported that Winfrey had called Frey and apologized for the surprise topic change of the January 26, 2006 interview. She made a televised apology in 2011. After the hoopla with Frey's Oprah appearance, South Park parodied the scandal surrounding the controversy in the episode "A Million Little Fibers".

=== Full Fathom Five ===
In 2009, Frey formed Full Fathom Five, a young adult novel publishing company aiming to create highly commercial novels like Twilight. In November 2010, controversy arose when a Master of Fine Arts (MFA) student who had been in talks to create content for the company was released from her extremely limiting contract online. The contract allows Frey license to remove an author from a project at any time, does not require him to give the author credit for his/her work, and only pays a standard advance of $250. A New York magazine article titled "James Frey's Fiction Factory" gives more details about the company, including information about the highly successful Lorien Legacies series, a collaboration between Jobie Hughes, a MFA student, and Frey. The article says Frey removed Hughes from the project, allegedly during a screaming match between the two authors. In the article, Frey is accused of abusing and using MFA students as cheap labor to churn out commercial young adult fiction.

== Bibliography ==
1. A Million Little Pieces (2003)
2. My Friend Leonard (2005)
3. Bright Shiny Morning (2009)
4. The Final Testament of the Holy Bible (2011)
5. The Calling (Endgame Book 1) (2014)
6. Sky Key (Endgame Book 2) (2015)
7. The Complete Training Diaries (Origins, Descendant, Existence) (Endgame Omnibus) (2015)
8. Rules of the Game (Endgame Book 3) (2016)
9. Endgame: The Complete Zero Line Chronicles (2016)
10. The Complete Fugitive Archives (Project Berlin, The Moscow Meeting, The Buried Cities) (2017)
11. Katerina (2018)
12. Next to Heaven (2025)

As a member of the collective pseudonym Pittacus Lore: Lorien Legacies

1. I Am Number Four (2010)
2. The Power of Six (2011)
3. The Rise of Nine (2012)
4. The Fall of Five (2013)
5. The Revenge of Seven (2014)
6. The Fate of Ten (2015)
7. United as One (2016)
8. Generation One (2017)
9. Fugitive Six (2018)
10. Return To Zero (2019)

== See also ==
- Misery literature
- Fake memoir
- Anthony Godby Johnson
- Dave Pelzer
