= Go Ask Alice =

1971 novel by Beatrice Sparks

- Dust jacket of Prentice Hall first edition, 1971
- Author: Beatrice Sparks
- Language: English
- Genre: Young adult fiction
- Published: 1971
- Publisher: Prentice Hall (1st edition); Simon & Schuster (later editions)
- Media type: Print (hardcover and paperback), ebook
- Pages: 159
- ISBN: 0-671-66458-1
- OCLC: 164716
- LC Class: PZ7 .G534

Go Ask Alice is a 1971 book about a teenage girl who develops a drug addiction at age 15 and runs away from home on a journey of self-destructive escapism. Attributed to "Anonymous" and first published in the United States, the book is in diary form, and was originally presented as being the edited actual diary of the unnamed teenage protagonist. Questions about the book's authenticity and true authorship began to arise in the late 1970s, and Beatrice Sparks is now generally viewed as the author of the found manuscript–styled fictional document. Sparks went on to write numerous other books purporting to be real diaries of troubled teenagers. Some sources have also named Linda Glovach as a co-author of the book. Nevertheless, its popularity has endured, and, as of 2014, it had remained continuously in print since its publication over four decades earlier.

Intended for a young adult audience, Go Ask Alice became a bestseller. It is praised for conveying a powerful message about the dangers of drug abuse. Go Ask Alice has also ranked among the most frequently challenged books for several decades due to its use of profanity and explicit references to sex and rape, as well as drugs. The book was adapted into the 1973 television film Go Ask Alice, starring Jamie Smith-Jackson and William Shatner. In 1976, a stage play of the same name, written by Frank Shiras and based on the book, was also published.

== Title ==
The title was taken from a line in the 1967 Grace Slick-penned Jefferson Airplane song "White Rabbit": "Go ask Alice/ when she's ten feet tall"; the lyrics in turn reference scenes in Lewis Carroll's 1865 novel Alice's Adventures in Wonderland, in which the title character Alice eats and drinks various substances, including a mushroom, that make her grow larger or smaller. Slick's song is understood as using Carroll's story as a metaphor for a drug experience.

The title Go Ask Alice was actually thought up by Kathy Fitzgerald, Sparks' editor at Prentice-Hall. Sparks' title was "Buried Alive", which Fitzgerald greatly disliked. Fitzgerald hit on the new title after overhearing a co-worker singing "White Rabbit" in an office hallway.

== Plot summary ==
In 1968, a 15-year-old girl begins keeping a diary, in which she records her thoughts and concerns about issues such as crushes, weight loss, sexuality, social acceptance, and relating to her parents. The dates and locations mentioned in the book place its events as occurring between 1968 and 1970 in California, Colorado, Oregon, and New York City. The two towns in which the diarist's family reside during the story are unidentified, the only indications being that universities are situated in both. The Great Salt Lake is also mentioned as a place where the diarist tried to dive and swim as a child.

The diarist's father, a college professor, accepts a dean position at a new college, requiring the family to relocate. The diarist has difficulty adjusting to her new school, but soon becomes best friends with a girl named Beth. When Beth leaves for summer camp, the diarist returns to her hometown, where she meets an old school acquaintance, who invites her to a party where glasses of cola—some of which are laced with LSD—are served. The diarist unwittingly ingests LSD and has an intense and pleasurable trip. Over the following days the diarist socializes with the other teens from the party, willingly uses more drugs, and loses her virginity while on acid. She worries that she may be pregnant, and her grandfather has a minor heart attack. Overwhelmed by her worries, the diarist begins to take sleeping pills, first stolen from her grandparents, then later prescribed. Her friendship with Beth ends, as both girls have moved in new directions.

The diarist befriends a hip girl, Chris, with whom she continues to use drugs. They date college students Richie and Ted, who deal drugs and persuade the two girls to help them by selling drugs at schools. When the girls walk in on Richie and Ted stoned and having sex with each other, they realize that their "boyfriends" were just using them to make money. The girls report Richie and Ted to the police and flee to San Francisco. Chris gets a job in a boutique with a glamorous older woman, Shelia, who invites both girls to lavish parties, where they resume taking drugs. One night Shelia and her new boyfriend introduce the girls to heroin and brutally rape them while they are under the influence of the drug. Traumatized, the diarist and Chris move to Berkeley where they open a jewelry shop. Although the shop is a success, they quickly grow tired of it and miss their families; they return home for a happy Christmas.

Back at home, the diarist encounters social pressure from her drug scene friends, and has problems getting along with her parents. Chris and the diarist try to stay away from drugs, but their resolve lapses and they end up on probation after being caught in a police raid. The diarist gets high one night and runs away. She travels to several cities, hitchhiking part way with a girl named Doris, who is a victim of child sexual abuse. The diarist continues to use drugs, running out of money. She thinks she has hit the jackpot when she goes to a hippie festival where "drugs are as free as the air", only to catch the eye of the event's drug kingpin, who demands the diarist fellate him or else her supply will be cut off. The diarist hits rock bottom when she experiences homelessness. In desperation, she seeks out a Catholic priest, who helps her and contacts her parents. The diarist runs out of space in her diary and says that the decision to buy a fresh one is synonymous with turning over a new leaf.

Now determined to avoid drugs, she faces hostility from her former friends. When one girl shows up high for a babysitting job, the diarist informs the girl's parents who beg her not to tell their daughter's parole officer. The diarist's former friends harass her at school and threaten her and her family. They eventually drug her against her will; she has a bad trip resulting in physical and mental damage, and is sent to a psychiatric hospital. The diary goes through passages of nonsense until the diarist can write clearly again, believing her body is being eaten by worms, which she eventually stops imagining. There she bonds with a younger girl named Babbie, who has also been a drug addict and child prostitute.

Released from the hospital, the diarist returns home, finally free of drugs. She now gets along better with her family, makes new friends, and is romantically involved with Joel, a man attending her father's college on the GI Bill. She is worried about starting school again, but feels stronger with the support of her new friends and Joel. In an optimistic mood, the diarist decides to stop keeping a diary and instead discuss her problems and thoughts with other people.

The epilogue states that the subject of the book died three weeks after the diarist's decision not to keep a third diary. The diarist was found dead in her home by her parents when they returned from a movie. She died from a drug overdose, either premeditated or accidental. The epilogue says that while the precise cause of death was never determined, it is but one of thousands of drug overdoses every year.

== Diarist's name ==
The anonymous diarist's name is never revealed in the book. In an episode where the diarist describes having sex with a drug dealer, she quotes an onlooker's remark indicating that her name may be Carla. Although a girl named Alice appears very briefly in the book, she is not the diarist, but a fellow runaway whom the diarist meets on the street in Coos Bay, Oregon.

Despite the lack of any evidence in the book that the diarist's name is Alice, the covers of various editions have suggested that her name is Alice by including blurb text such as "This is Alice's true story" and "You can't ask Alice anything anymore. But you can do something—read her diary." Reviewers and commentators have also frequently referred to the anonymous diarist as "Alice", sometimes for convenience.

In the 1973 television film based on the book, the protagonist played by Jamie Smith-Jackson is named "Alice". The protagonist is also named "Alice Aberdeen" in the 1976 stage play adaptation.

== Production ==
The manuscript that later became Go Ask Alice was initially prepared for publication by Beatrice Sparks, a Mormon youth counselor then in her early 50s, who had previously done various forms of writing. Sparks had reportedly noted that the general public at that time lacked knowledge about youth drug abuse, and she likely had both educational and moral motives for publishing the book. Sparks later claimed that the book was based on a real diary she received from a real teenage girl, although this claim was never substantiated and the girl has never been identified (see Authorship and veracity controversies). In the 1982 Avon paperback version of Go Ask Alice the Library of Congress lists the book as "fiction."

With the help of Art Linkletter, a popular talk show host for whom Sparks had worked as a ghostwriter, the manuscript was passed on to Linkletter's literary agent, who sold it to Prentice Hall. Linkletter, who had become a prominent anti-drug crusader after the 1969 suicide of his daughter Diane, also helped publicize the book. Even before its publication, Go Ask Alice had racked up large advance orders of 18,000 copies.

== Reception ==
=== Public reception ===
Upon its 1971 publication, Go Ask Alice quickly became a publishing sensation and an international bestseller, being translated into 16 languages. Its success has been attributed to the timing of its publication at the height of the psychedelic era, when the negative effects of drug use were becoming a public concern. Alleen Pace Nilsen has called it "the book that came closest to being a YA phenomenon" of its time, although saying it was "never as famous as [the later] Harry Potter, Twilight, and Hunger Games series". In addition to being very popular with its intended young adult audience, Go Ask Alice also attracted a significant number of adult readers.

Libraries had difficulty obtaining and keeping enough copies of the book on the shelves to meet demand. The 1973 television film based on the book heightened reader interest, and librarians reported having to order additional copies of the book each time the film was broadcast.

By 1975, more than three million copies of the book had reportedly been sold, and by 1979 the paperback edition had been reprinted 43 times. The book remained continuously in print over the ensuing decades, with reported sales of over four million copies by 1998, and over five million copies by 2009. The actual number of readers probably surpassed the sales figures, as library copies and even personal copies were likely circulated to more than one reader. Go Ask Alice has been cited as establishing both the commercial potential of young adult fiction in general, and the genre of young adult anti-drug novels, and has been called "one of the most famous anti-drug books ever published."

=== Critical response ===
Go Ask Alice received positive initial reviews, including praise from Webster Schott in The New York Times, who called it an "extraordinary work", a "superior work" and a "document of horrifying reality [that] possesses literary quality". It was also recommended by Library Journal, Publishers Weekly, and The Christian Science Monitor, and ranked number 1 on the American Library Association's 1971 list of Best Books for Young Adults. Some reviews focused on the realism of the book's material, without further addressing the literary merit of the book. According to Nilsen and Lauren Adams, the book was not subjected to the regular forms of literary criticism because it was presumed to be the real diary of a dead teenager. Lina Goldberg has suggested that the publishers were motivated to list the author as "Anonymous" partly to avoid such criticism.

Years after its publication, Go Ask Alice continued to receive some good reviews, often in the context of defending the book against censors (see Censorship). In a 1995 Village Voice column for Banned Books Week, Nat Hentoff described it as "an extraordinarily powerful account of what it's actually like to get hooked on drugs" that "doesn't preach".

However, starting in the 1990s, the book began to draw criticism for its heavy-handedness, melodramatic style and inauthenticity, in view of the growing evidence that it was fiction rather than a real teenager's diary (see Authorship and veracity controversies). Reviewing the book again for The New York Times in 1998, Marc Oppenheimer called it "poorly written", "laughably written", and "incredible", although some other writers have pointed to the material as being plausible or even appealing to young readers. The portrayal of the diarist's drug use, progressing from unwittingly ingesting LSD to injecting speed within a few days, and making a similar quick transition from her first use of marijuana to heroin, has been deemed unrealistic. The book has been criticized for equating homosexuality with "degradation", illness, sin, and guilt. More recent analyses have expressed ethical concerns with the book's presentation of fiction to young readers as a true story. Despite all these criticisms, the book is frequently called a young adult classic.

=== Educational use ===
Although school boards and committees reached varying conclusions about whether Go Ask Alice had literary value, educators generally viewed it as a strong cautionary warning against drug use. It was recommended to parents and assigned or distributed in some schools as an anti-drug teaching tool. However, some adults who read the book as teens or pre-teens have written that they paid little attention to the anti-drug message and instead related to the diarist's thoughts and emotions, or vicariously experienced the thrills of her rebellious behavior. Reading the book for such vicarious experience has been suggested as a positive alternative to actually doing drugs. Go Ask Alice has also been used in curricula dealing with mood swings and death.

== Authorship and veracity ==
Although Go Ask Alice has been credited to an anonymous author since its publication, and was originally promoted as the real, albeit edited, diary of a teenage girl, over time the book has come to be regarded by researchers as a fake memoir written by Beatrice Sparks, possibly with the help of one or more co-authors. Despite significant evidence of Sparks' authorship, a percentage of readers and educators have continued to believe that the book is a true-life account of a teenage girl.

=== Beatrice Sparks authorship controversy ===
Go Ask Alice was originally published by Prentice Hall in 1971 as the work of an unnamed author "Anonymous". The original edition contained a note signed by "The Editors" that included the statements, "Go Ask Alice is based on the actual diary of a fifteen-year-old drug user....Names, dates, places and certain events have been changed in accordance with the wishes of those concerned." The paperback edition first published in 1972 by Avon Books contained the words "A Real Diary" on the front cover just above the title, and the same words were included on the front covers of some later editions.

The cover art of the Avon Books paperback edition of Go Ask Alice presented it as "A Real Diary".

Upon its publication, almost all contemporary reviewers and the general public accepted it as primarily authored by an anonymous teenager. According to Lauren Adams, Publishers Weekly magazine was the only source to question the book's authenticity on the grounds that it "seem[ed] awfully well written". Reviews described the book as either the authentic diary of a real teenage girl, or as an edited or slightly fictionalized version of her authentic diary. Some sources claimed that the girl's parents had arranged for her diary to be published after her death. However, according to Alleen Pace Nilsen, a "reputable source in the publishing world" allegedly said that the book was published anonymously because the parents had initiated legal action and threatened to sue if the published book could be traced back to their daughter.

Not long after Go Ask Alice's publication, Beatrice Sparks began making public appearances presenting herself as the book's editor. (Ellen Roberts, who in the early 1970s was an editor at Prentice Hall, was also credited at that time with having edited the book; a later source refers to Roberts as having "consulted" on the book.) According to Caitlin White, when Sparks' name became public, some researchers discovered that copyright records listed Sparks as the sole author—not editor—of the book, raising questions about whether she had written it herself. Suspicions were heightened in 1979 after two newly published books about troubled teenagers (Voices and Jay's Journal) advertised Sparks' involvement by calling her "the author who brought you Go Ask Alice".

In an article by Nilsen, based in part on interviews with Sparks and published in the October 1979 issue of School Library Journal, Sparks said that she had received the diaries that became Go Ask Alice from a girl she had befriended at a youth conference. The girl allegedly gave Sparks her diaries in order to help Sparks understand the experiences of young drug users and to prevent her parents from reading them. According to Sparks, the girl later died, although not of an overdose. Sparks said she had then transcribed the diaries, destroying parts of them in the process (with the remaining portions locked in the publisher's vault and unavailable for review by Nilsen or other investigators), and added various fictional elements, including the overdose death. Although Sparks did not confirm or deny the allegations that the diarist's parents had threatened a lawsuit, she did say that in order to get a release from the parents, she had only sought to use the diaries as a "basis to which she would add other incidents and thoughts gleaned from similar case studies," according to Nilsen.

Nilsen wrote that Sparks now wanted to be seen as the author of the popular Go Ask Alice in order to promote additional books in the same vein that she had published or was planning to publish. (These books included Jay's Journal, another alleged diary of a real teenager that Sparks was later accused of mostly authoring herself.) Nilsen concluded, "The question of how much of Go Ask Alice was written by the real Alice and how much by Beatrice Sparks can only be conjectured." Journalist Melissa Katsoulis, in her 2009 history of literary hoaxes Telling Tales, wrote that Sparks was never able to substantiate her claim that Go Ask Alice was based on the real diary of a real girl and that copyright records continued to list her as the sole author of the work.

Urban folklore expert Barbara Mikkelson of snopes.com has written that even before the authorship revelations, ample evidence indicated that Go Ask Alice was not an actual diary. According to Mikkelson, the writing style and content—including a lengthy description of an LSD trip but relatively little about "the loss of [the diarist's] one true love", school, gossip, or ordinary "chit-chat"—seems uncharacteristic of a teenage girl's diary. The sophisticated vocabulary of the diary suggested that it had been written by an adult rather than a teen. Mikkelson also noted that in the decades since the book's publication, no one who knew the diarist had ever been tracked down by a reporter or otherwise spoken about or identified the diarist.

In hindsight, commentators have suggested various motivations for the publishers to present Go Ask Alice as the work of an anonymous deceased teenager, such as avoiding literary criticism, lending validity to an otherwise improbable story, and stimulating young readers' interest by having the book's anti-drug advice come from a teenager rather than an adult. Sparks said that while there were "many reasons" for publishing the book anonymously, her main reason was to make it more credible to young readers. Although the book has been classified as fiction (see Treatment of book as fiction and non-fiction), the publisher has continued to list its author as "Anonymous".

=== Veracity of other works by Sparks ===
Sparks was involved in a similar controversy regarding the veracity of her second diary project, the 1979 book Jay's Journal. It was allegedly the real diary, edited by Sparks, of a teenage boy who died by suicide after becoming involved with the occult. The publisher's initial marketing of the book raised questions about whether Sparks had edited a real teenager's diary or written a fictional diary, and recalled the same controversy with respect to Go Ask Alice. Later, the family of real-life teenage suicide Alden Barrett contended that Jay's Journal used 21 entries from Barrett's real diary that the family had given to Sparks, but that the other 191 entries in the published book had been fictionalized or fabricated by Sparks, and that Barrett had not been involved with the occult or "devil worship".

Sparks went on to produce numerous other books presented as diaries of anonymous troubled teens (including Annie's Baby: The Diary of Anonymous, a Pregnant Teenager and It Happened to Nancy: By an Anonymous Teenager) or edited transcripts of therapy sessions with teens (including Almost Lost: The True Story of an Anonymous Teenager's Life on the Streets). Some commentators have noted that these books use writing styles similar to Go Ask Alice and contain similar themes, such as tragic consequences for spending time with bad companions, a protagonist who initially gets into trouble by accident or through someone else's actions, and portrayal of premarital sex and homosexuality as always wrong. Although Sparks was typically listed on these books as editor or preparer, the number of similar books that Sparks published, making her "arguably the most prolific Anonymous author in publishing", fueled suspicions that she wrote Go Ask Alice.

=== Linda Glovach authorship claims ===
In a 1998 New York Times book review, Mark Oppenheimer suggested that Go Ask Alice had at least one author besides Sparks. He identified Linda Glovach, an author of young-adult novels, as "one of the 'preparers'—let's call them forgers—of Go Ask Alice", although he did not give his source for this claim. Publishers Weekly, in a review of Glovach's 1998 novel Beauty Queen (which told the story, in diary form, of a 19-year-old girl addicted to heroin), also stated that Glovach was "a co-author of Go Ask Alice".

== Treatment of book as fiction and non-fiction ==
Cover of the 2011 Arrow Books paperback edition, containing the words "This Is Alice's True Story"

Following Sparks' statements that she had added fictional elements to Go Ask Alice, the book was classified by its publishers as fiction (and remains so classified as of 2016) and a disclaimer was added to the copyright page: "This book is a work of fiction. Any references to historical events, real people, or real locales are used fictitiously. Other names, characters, places, and incidents are the product of the author's imagination, and any resemblance to actual events or locales or persons, living or dead, is entirely coincidental."

Despite the classification and the disclaimer, Go Ask Alice has frequently been taught as non-fiction in schools and sold as non-fiction in bookstores. The publishers also continued to suggest that the book was true by including the "Editors' Note" stating that the book was based on an actual diary, and listing the author as "Anonymous", with no mention of Sparks. As of 2011, a UK paperback edition published and marketed by Arrow Books contained the statement "This Is Alice's True Story" on the front cover.

== Censorship ==
Go Ask Alice has been a frequent target of censorship challenges due to its inclusion of profanity and references to runaways, drugs, sex, and rape. Alleen Pace Nilsen wrote that in 1973, Go Ask Alice was "the book that teens wanted to read and that adults wanted to censor" and that the censors "felt the book did more to glorify sex and drugs than to frighten kids away from them." Challenges began in the early 1970s following the initial publication of the book, and continued at a high rate through the ensuing decades.

Some challenges resulted in the removal of the book from libraries, or in parental permission being required for a student to check the book out of a library. According to The New York Times, in the 1970s it became common practice for school libraries to keep Go Ask Alice off library shelves and make it available to students only upon request, a practice that was criticized as being a form of censorship. A 1982 survey of school librarians across the United States, co-sponsored by the National Council of Teachers of English, found that Go Ask Alice was the most frequently censored book in high school libraries.

Decades after its original publication, Go Ask Alice became one of the most challenged books of the 1990s and 2000s. On the American Library Association (ALA) list of the 100 most frequently challenged books of the 1990s, Go Ask Alice was ranked at number 25; on the ALA list compiled for the 2000s, it rose to position 18.

The likely authoring of the book by one or more adults rather than by an unnamed teenage girl has not been an issue in censorship disputes. Nilsen and others have criticized this on the basis that the dishonesty of presenting a probable fake memoir to young readers as real should raise greater concerns than the content.

== Adaptations ==
The ABC television network broadcast a made-for-television movie, Go Ask Alice, based on the book. It starred Jamie Smith-Jackson, William Shatner, Ruth Roman, Wendell Burton, Julie Adams, and Andy Griffith. Also among the cast were Robert Carradine, Mackenzie Phillips, and Charles Martin Smith. The film was promoted as an anti-drug film based on a true story.

The film was first aired as the ABC Movie of the Week on January 24, 1973. It was subsequently rebroadcast on October 24, 1973, and the network also made screening copies available to school, church and civic groups upon request. The film drew generally good reviews (with one critic calling it "the finest anti-drug drama ever presented by TV"), but was also criticized for lacking the complexity of the book and for not offering any solutions to the problem of teen drug addiction. The adaptation by Ellen Violett was nominated for an Emmy Award.

In 1976, a stage play version of the book, adapted by Frank Shiras, was published by The Dramatic Publishing Company. The play has been produced by various high school and community theatre groups.

A 2012 novel called Lucy in the Sky was published anonymously, featuring the story of a preppy Santa Monica student who falls into drug addiction and alcoholism. Critics compared the book with Go Ask Alice and viewed the 2012 book negatively, considering it a modernized copy of Go Ask Alice rather than its own story.

== In popular culture ==
Stand-up comedian Paul F. Tompkins' 2009 comedy album Freak Wharf contains a track titled "Go Ask Alice" in which he derides the book as "the phoniest of balonies" and jokingly suggests it was authored by the writing staff of the police drama series Dragnet. The album title comes from a passage in the book in which the diarist refers to a mental hospital as a "freak wharf".

American band Ice Nine Kills drew inspiration from the book for their song "Alice" on the 2015 album Every Trick in the Book.

Musical artist Melanie Martinez based her unreleased track, "Birthing Addicts", on the book in 2011. The song was originally written for an extra credit assignment at her school. It was meant to be on her unreleased EP, Take Me to the Moon, but was scrapped upon completion.

== See also ==
- Misery literature
- Literary forgery
