= Beatrice Sparks =

American writer and hoaxer (1917–2012)

- Born: Beatrice Ruby Mathews; January 15, 1917; Goldburg, Idaho, U.S.
- Died: May 25, 2012 (aged 95); Provo, Utah, U.S.
- Occupations: Author; youth counselor (claimed); speaker; hoaxer
- Writing career
- Language: English
- Notable works: Go Ask Alice; Jay's Journal

Beatrice Sparks, born Beatrice Ruby Mathews (January 15, 1917 – May 25, 2012) was an American writer and hoaxer who produced a series of books purporting to be the "real diaries" of troubled teenagers. The books deal with topical issues such as drug abuse, Satanism, teenage pregnancy, and AIDS, and are presented as cautionary tales. Her 1971 book Go Ask Alice (credited to "Anonymous") has sold nearly six million copies.

Although Sparks presented herself as merely the discoverer and editor of the diaries, records at the U.S. Copyright Office list her as the sole author for all but two of them. Later researchers have claimed that despite her claiming to be the editor of real teenagers diaries, she, in fact, invented the stories herself.

== Biography ==
=== Early life ===
Beatrice Ruby Mathews was born in Goldburg, Custer County, Idaho and grew up in Logan, Utah. Leaving home at 17 to move to California, she married LaVorn Sparks in 1937. The couple started a family, having three children (one of whom died in infancy) and were members of The Church of Jesus Christ of Latter-day Saints. After some early financial struggles, LaVorn Sparks became wealthy having successfully speculated in Texas oil during WWII.

After WWII, the Sparks family lived a very comfortable existence for nearly twenty years in Los Angeles. Usually working as "Bee Sparks" (though sometimes using the pen-name "Susan LaVorn"), aspiring writer Beatrice contributed to circulars distributed by local businesses and to church publications. In her self-written author bios of the period, she claimed variously to have studied at Utah State Agricultural College, or to have studied psychology and philosophy at the University of Utah.

In the early 1950's, she co-authored a play with Barbera called The Maid and the Martian, which ran in Los Angeles and was a moderate local success. (A pre-fame James Arness starred in one run of the play.) The play was eventually turned into the film Pajama Party in 1964, but after numerous changes to the idea and dialogue, Sparks' name was omitted from the film's credits.

Their kids having grown, Beatrice and LaVorn Sparks moved to a large mansion in Provo, Utah in 1964.

Beatrice Sparks had volunteered at a veteran's hospital in L.A., and continued her volunteer work at the Utah State Hospital in Provo. In later tellings by Sparks, she was a youth counselor at the hospital, as well as for a youth summer camp run on the campus of Brigham Young University -- this is where she alleges to have met the young woman who wrote the diaries that became Go Ask Alice. In fact, while it's possible she met a young woman there that was the inspiration for the book, her volunteer duties at the hospital and the summer camp were strictly administrative or organizational in nature, and did not include professional counseling.

=== Go Ask Alice (1971) ===
Sparks claimed that her experiences working with troubled adolescents made her want to produce cautionary tales that would keep other teens from falling into the same traps. Her first book, Go Ask Alice, was presented by Sparks to a publisher as a diary that had been given to her by a young girl who subsequently died. Though Sparks received the book's author royalties, it was published under the byline "Anonymous" in 1971 at her agent's and publisher's insistence, as the publisher felt that by presenting the diary as the work of anonymous teen, the book would connect more strongly with the intended teen audience.. The book was presented as the diary of an unnamed teenage girl who became involved in drugs and underage sex, vowed to clean up, but then died from an overdose a few weeks after her final diary entry.

When Go Ask Alice became a bestseller with several million copies sold, Sparks received substantial royalties, but as an aspiring author she was frustrated that her name was not on the book. In interviews conducted over the next few years, Sparks identified herself as the book's editor and claimed that it consisted partly of the actual diary of a troubled teen, and partly of embellished events based on Sparks's experiences working with other teens. Sparks was unable to produce the original diary for critics, and investigator Alleen Pace Nelson publicly questioned the book's veracity and verifiability. Later editions of the book contained the standard disclaimer: "This book is a work of fiction. Any references to historical events, real people, or real locales are used fictitiously. Other names, places, characters, and incidents are the product of the author's imagination, and any resemblance to actual events or locales or persons, living or dead, is entirely coincidental."

=== Voices (1978) and Jay's Journal (1979) ===
In 1978, Sparks issued a second book, called Voices, which was alleged to contain transcripts of interviews with four troubled teens. No proof was made available that the four youths existed, and contemporary reviews noted that all four interview subjects sounded very much alike, with the School Library Journal noting "the teenagers are not believable, they seem merely vehicles for Sparks' theorizing." Voices was widely panned, and was a commercial failure.

Her next book appeared just a year later, though its genesis stretches back a few years. In 1973, while Go Ask Alice was still enjoying widespread success, Marcella Barrett of Pleasant Grove, Utah approached Sparks about editing the journal of Barrett's deceased son Alden. Alden had suffered from depression and died of suicide at age 16 in 1971, and his mother felt that his story might help other at-risk teens. The result was Jay's Journal in 1979, which presents the purported diary of a teenage boy named Jay who was drawn into Satanism and then took his own life for ritualistic purposes. Barrett's family was horrified by the book, and despite the changed name, residents of Pleasant Grove quickly concluded that "Jay" was in fact Alden Barrett. Barrett's family insisted that he had never been involved with Satanism or the occult, and that Sparks had used only 21 entries from his true journal (none of which mentioned Satanism in any respect whatsoever) while the book contained 212 passages purporting to be from that same journal. Barrett's family also contended that Sparks fabricated stories of Satanic rituals for the book; Sparks responded that she got the extra material from letters and interviews with Alden's friends (no copies of which were ever offered by Sparks, or subsequently discovered by others.) Later investigators suggested that Sparks added claims of Satanism so Jay's Journal could receive a promotional boost from then-current social concerns about that topic; conversely, the book directly influenced the Satanic Panic of the 1980s.

=== Doctorate claims and later work ===
Starting in the 1980s, Sparks claimed to be a licensed psychotherapist and youth counselor with a Ph.D. (variously described at different times as being in psychology, psychiatry or human behavior.) At various junctures, she claimed to have studied at UCLA, Columbia University and/or Brigham Young University; no records of her attending UCLA or Columbia have ever come to light, and BYU has only a record of Sparks attending a few months of undergraduate classes in 1989. Researchers have been unable to find any record of the Ph.D. she claimed on book jackets and in her resume. Furthermore, although she claimed to be a practicing therapist, no records of her being licensed to practice in any state have ever been offered or discovered. One interviewer wrote that Sparks was "vague about specifics" when asked about her counseling qualifications and professional experience.

After a gap of over a decade after Jay's Journal was published, starting in 1994 Sparks began producing several more "real diaries", including It Happened to Nancy: By an Anonymous Teenager (dealing with AIDS), Almost Lost: The True Story of an Anonymous Teenager's Life on the Streets (gang violence), Annie's Baby: The Diary of Anonymous, A Pregnant Teenager, Treacherous Love: The Diary of an Anonymous Teenager (pupil seduced by teacher), Kim: Empty Inside: The Diary of an Anonymous Teenager (eating disorders), and Finding Katie: The Diary of Anonymous, A Teenager in Foster Care. In several of these later books, she inserted herself as a character: "Dr. Beatrice Sparks" (familiarly called "Dr. B" by her patients) was a world-renowned child/young adult therapist who worked with the diarists as they tackled their issues. The seemingly awestruck diarists would then proceed to write glowingly of Dr. B. in their diaries. None of these later works received anywhere near the amount of attention as Go Ask Alice or even Jay's Journal, and no proof was ever offered of their veracity, or indeed of the existence of any of the subjects. The alleged practice of "Dr. Sparks" was similarly undocumented.

=== Final years and legacy ===
LaVorn Sparks died in 2003. Beatrice Sparks lived to the age of 95, and died in Provo, Utah in 2012.

Serious doubts about the provenance of the diaries and interviews that formed Sparks' work had been published as early as 1978, and the number of openly critical pieces only increased over the years, with Snopes denouncing Go Ask Alice as "manufactured hooey" in a 2003 article.

In the 2022 book Unmask Alice: LSD, Satanic Panic, and the Imposter Behind the World's Most Notorious Diaries, investigator Rick Emerson presented evidence that most – if not all – of Sparks's works were hoaxes, made up of fabricated prose that Sparks claimed to be copies of real diaries from (or interviews with) teenagers who never actually existed; and in the case of Jay's Journal, significantly altered and padded prose from Alden Barrett's true diary. Furthermore, Emerson demonstrated that certain unusual or quirky phrases, oddly specific metaphors, and unlikely idiomatic expressions recur in different diaries – even though these diaries were ostensibly written by different people, sometimes decades apart. Emerson also noted that many of Sparks' books contained cover blurbs from doctors or therapists, lauding the book within. These blurbs were provided to the publisher by Sparks, and these doctors and therapists were shown by Emerson to be non-existent.

Emerson estimates that Go Ask Alice has sold nearly six million copies. The book has never fallen out of print since its initial publication in 1971.

== Bibliography ==
=== Purported 'diaries'/interviews ===
All but one of these books were published with the byline "Anonymous". Some of them credit Sparks as editor; others (such as Go Ask Alice) do not mention her at all. Almost Lost and Kim – Empty Inside are the only books for which Sparks does not claim copyright as author of the entire work. For both these books, Sparks lays claim only to the editing, compilation, and some (unspecified) additional material. The U.S. Copyright Office record for Kim – Empty Inside adds the note that some material is taken from a preexisting diary.

Voices is alleged to be transcribed from interviews conducted by Sparks, rather than being an edited diary. She is listed as the work's author with the U.S. Copyright Office.

- Go Ask Alice (1971)
- Voices: The Stories of Four Troubled Teenagers as Told in Personal Interviews to Beatrice Sparks (1978)
- Jay's Journal (1979)
- It Happened to Nancy: By an Anonymous Teenager (1994)
- Almost Lost: The True Story of an Anonymous Teenager's Life on the Streets (1996)
- Annie's Baby: The Diary of Anonymous, a Pregnant Teenager (1998)
- Treacherous Love: The Diary of an Anonymous Teenager (2000)
- Kim – Empty Inside: The Diary of an Anonymous Teenager (2002)
- Finding Katie: The Diary of Anonymous, A Teenager in Foster Care (2005)

=== Other works ===
- The Kalamity Kids (video) (1991)

== See also ==
- Misery literature
- Fake memoir
- JT LeRoy
