= A Million Little Pieces =

2003 novel by James Frey

- Author: James Frey
- Cover artist: Rodrigo Corral
- Language: English
- Genre: Misery lit
- Published: April 15, 2003 (John Murray)
- Publication place: United States
- Media type: Print (hardback & paperback)
- ISBN: 0-385-50775-5
- OCLC: 51223590
- Dewey Decimal: 362.29/092 B 21
- LC Class: HV5831.M6 F74 2003
- Followed by: My Friend Leonard
- Website: Official website

A Million Little Pieces is a book by James Frey, originally sold as a memoir and later marketed as a semi-fictional novel following Frey's admission that many parts of the book were fabricated. It tells the story of a 23-year-old alcoholic and abuser of other drugs and how he copes with rehabilitation in a twelve steps-oriented treatment center.

== Summary ==
A badly tattered James wakes up on a commercial flight to Minneapolis, with injuries that he has no recollection of having sustained or of how he ended up on the plane. He is met by his brother at the airport, who takes him to a rehabilitation clinic. It is revealed that James is 23 years old, and has been an alcoholic for ten years, and a crack addict for three. He is also wanted by the police in three states on several charges.

As he checks into the rehab clinic, he is forced to quit his substance abuse, a transition that later probably saves his life, while also an agonizing process. As part of this, he is forced to undergo a series of painful root canals, without any anesthesia because of possible negative reactions to the drugs. He copes with the pain by squeezing tennis balls until his nails crack. (Note: When challenged on this specific incident during his second Oprah appearance, Frey said that there may have been "more than one" root canal procedure and it might or might not have included Novocaine, as he remembers it.)

The book follows Frey through the painful experiences that lead up to his eventual release from the center, including his participation in the clinic's family program with his brother, despite his strong desire not to. Throughout the novel, Frey speaks of the "Fury" he is fighting, which he sees as the cause of his desire to drink alcohol and use other drugs. The "Fury" could be seen as the antagonist of the novel, because he believes that he will not be able to recover until he learns to ignore it or "kill" it.

Frey meets many interesting people in the clinic, with whom he forms relationships and who play an important role in his life both during and after his time in the clinic. These people include a mafia boss who plays a vital role in his recovery (subject of Frey's subsequent book My Friend Leonard), and a female drug addict with whom he falls in love, despite strict rules forbidding contact between men and women at the clinic. James finally recovers and never relapses.

== Reception ==
The book was released on April 15, 2003, by Doubleday Books, a division of Random House, and received mixed feedback. While some critics, such as Pat Conroy, praised the book, calling it "the War and Peace of addiction", others were not as impressed by the gruesome nature of the book and Frey's overall attitude that sets the tone for the book. For example, critic Julian Keeling, a recovering addict, stated that "Frey's stylistic tactics are irritating...none of this makes the reader feel well-disposed towards him". Also, author Heather King said that "A Million Little Pieces rings false".

Poet and author John Dolan of The eXile roundly criticized the book, saying:

Frey sums up his entire life in one sentence from p. 351 of this 382-page memoir: "I took money from my parents and I spent it on drugs." Given the simplicity and familiarity of the story, you might wonder what Frey does in the other 381 pages. The story itself is simple: he goes through rehab at an expensive private clinic, with his parents footing the bill. That's it. 400 pages of hanging around a rehab clinic.

He was also scathing about the writing style, which he described as a "childish impersonation of the laconic Hemingway style", and sarcastically referred to it as an enquoted "novel" several times.

In September 2005, the book was picked as an Oprah's Book Club selection, and shortly thereafter became the number-one paperback non-fiction book on Amazon.com, and it topped The New York Times Best Seller list for fifteen straight weeks. By January 28, 2006, it had fallen to number four on the Amazon.com list with Winfrey's following selection, Night by Elie Wiesel, taking over the top position.

The book garnered international attention in January 2006 after it was reported that it contained fabrications and was not, as originally represented by the author and publisher, a completely factual memoir.

== Doubts on its authenticity ==
After a six-week investigation, The Smoking Gun published an article on January 8, 2006, called "A Million Little Lies". The article described fabrications in Frey's account of his drug abuse experiences, life, and criminal record. According to CNN, The Smoking Gun's editor, William Bastone, said: "the probe was prompted after the Oprah show aired". He further stated, "We initially set off to just find a mug shot of him... It basically set off a chain of events that started with us having a difficult time finding a booking photo of this guy".

The Minneapolis Star Tribune had questioned James Frey's claims as early as 2003. Frey responded at that time by saying, "I've never denied I've altered small details."

Stories surfaced about Random House, publisher of A Million Little Pieces, deciding to give full refunds to anyone who had purchased the book directly through it. According to a Gawker.com report, customers could have a claim to money if they truly felt deceived by Frey.

In an article detailing the book, Frey is quoted saying he "stands by the book as being the essential truth of my life". However, on January 26, 2006, Frey once again appeared on The Oprah Winfrey Show and this time admitted that the same "demons" that had made him turn to alcohol and other drugs had also driven him to fabricate crucial portions of his "memoir", it first having been shopped as being a novel but declined by many, including Random House itself. Winfrey told Frey that she felt "really duped" but that, "more importantly, I feel that you betrayed millions of readers." She also apologized for her previous telephoned statement to Larry King Live—during Frey's appearance on that show on January 11, 2006—that what mattered was not the truth of Frey's book, but its value as a therapeutic tool for addicts. She said, "I left the impression that the truth is not important." During the show, Winfrey interrogated Frey about everything from the number of root canals he had to the existence of his girlfriend, Lilly. Winfrey then brought out Frey's publisher, Nan A. Talese, to defend her decision to classify the book as a memoir, and forced Talese to admit that she had done nothing to check the book's veracity, despite the fact that her representatives had assured Winfrey's staff that the book was indeed non-fiction and described it as "brutally honest" in a press release.

David Carr of The New York Times wrote, "Both Mr. Frey and Ms. Talese were snapped in two like dry winter twigs." "Oprah annihilates Frey", proclaimed Larry King. The New York Times columnist Maureen Dowd wrote, "It was a huge relief, after our long national slide into untruth and no consequences, into swiftboating and swift bucks, into W.'s delusion and denial, to see the Empress of Empathy icily hold someone accountable for lying", and The Washington Post's Richard Cohen was so impressed by the confrontation that he crowned Winfrey "Mensch of the Year".

On January 13, 2006, Steven Levitt, co-author of the book Freakonomics, stated in his blog that, having searched the Centers for Disease Control and Prevention database of mortality detail records, he was unable to identify a single death that reasonably closely matched Frey's description of the circumstances of the death of "Lilly", Frey's alleged girlfriend in the book. Following Frey's admission to Winfrey that he had altered Lilly's method of suicide in the book from cutting her wrists to hanging, on January 27, 2006, Levitt recorded on his blog that he was again unable to find a recorded death consistent with Frey's revised description, having previously written, "Frey's primary defense has been to say that his criminal history is a minor part of the book and these inconsistencies do not substantively change the meaning of the story. Of course, his criminal history is the only thing that thesmokinggun.com actually looked into. Given that virtually nothing checked out, it doesn't bode well for the veracity of the rest of the book."

=== Reactions ===
The publishers of the book, Doubleday and Anchor Books, initially stood by Frey, but further examination of the evidence eventually caused the publishers to alter their stances. They released a statement noting, "When the Smoking Gun report appeared, our first response, given that we were still learning the facts of the matter, was to support our author. Since then, we have questioned him about the allegations and have sadly come to the realization that a number of facts have been altered and incidents embellished." As a consequence, the publishers decided to include a publisher's note and an author's note from Frey as disclaimers to be included in future publications. According to the source at the company, there had been some disagreement among editors at the publishing house about Mr. Frey's authenticity, but the early dissenters had been silenced by the book's commercial success, both pre- and post-Oprah.

Random House issued a statement regarding the controversy. It stated that future editions of the book would contain notes from both the publisher and Frey on the text, as well as prominent notations on the cover and on their website about the additions. On September 12, 2006, Frey and publisher Random House, Inc. reached a tentative legal settlement, where readers who felt that they had been defrauded by Frey's A Million Little Pieces would be offered a refund. In order to receive the refund, customers must submit a proof of purchase, pieces of the book itself (page 163 from the hardcover edition or the front cover from the paperback), and complete a sworn statement indicating that they purchased the book under the assumption that it was a memoir.

In Frey's note to readers, which will be included in future editions of the book, he apologized for fabricating portions of his book and for having made himself seem "tougher and more daring and more aggressive than in reality I was, or I am." He added,

People cope with adversity in many different ways, ways that are deeply personal. [...] My mistake [...] is writing about the person I created in my mind to help me cope, and not the person who went through the experience.

Frey admitted that he had literary reasons for his fabrications as well:

I wanted the stories in the book to ebb and flow, to have dramatic arcs, to have the tension that all great stories require.

Nevertheless, he defended the right of memoirists to draw upon their memories, not simply upon documented facts, in creating their memoirs. Additionally, Frey has discussed the controversy and stated his side of the argument on his blog.

Shortly after Frey's return to the Oprah Winfrey show, the Brooklyn Public Library went as far as recataloging Frey's book as fiction, although it appears most other libraries have not followed suit. The New York Times Best Seller list still includes it on the Paperback Nonfiction List as of September 2006.

Regardless of this controversy, the book has been published in twenty-nine languages worldwide and has sold over 5 million copies. The majority of these sales occurred after Oprah announced it as the new Oprah's Book Club book.

On July 28, 2007, at a literary convention in Texas, Nan Talese spoke of Oprah Winfrey as having been "mean and self-serving" and having had a "holier-than-thou attitude" and "fiercely bad manners" during Winfrey's debate with Talese and James Frey on January 26, 2006. Talese said she and Frey were led to believe the show was going to be a panel discussion on "Truth in America". Just before air time, both Talese and Frey were told the topic of the show had been changed to "The James Frey Controversy", thus the ambush began. Talese stated that Oprah needed to apologize for her behavior on the show. However Joyce Carol Oates said "This is an ethical issue which can be debated passionately and with convincing arguments on both sides. In the end, Oprah Winfrey had to defend her own ethical standards of truth on her television program, which was courageous of her." Talese was unapologetic about publishing Frey's A Million Little Pieces and commented the book has great value for anyone who must deal with a loved one who is an addict.

In 2017, Anthony Bourdain described the book as "such an obvious, transparent, steaming heap of falsehood from the first page that I was enraged that anyone on earth would believe a word. As a former addict, I found this fake redemption memoir to be morally repugnant."

== Film adaptation ==
In October 2017, it was announced that director Sam Taylor-Johnson and her husband, actor Aaron Taylor-Johnson were working on a film adaptation of the novel. The film premiered in 2018, with general release in 2019.

== See also ==
- Fake memoir
- Misery literature
- "A Million Little Fibers", an episode of South Park in which the character Towelie appears on Oprah after falsifying his own memoir.
