= Proviso West High School =

Location
- 4701 W. Harrison Street; Hillside, Illinois 60162; United States; 41.8675°N 87.9°W

Information
- School type: Public secondary
- Opened: 1958
- School district: Proviso Twp. HS Dist. 209
- Superintendent: Krish Mohip
- Principal: Jeremy Christian
- Teaching staff: 111.15 (on an FTE basis)
- Grades: 9–12
- Gender: Co-ed
- Enrollment: 1,870 (2024–2025)
- Average class size: 19.0
- Student to teacher ratio: 16.82
- Campus: Suburban
- Colours: Red; White
- Athletics conference: West Suburban Conference
- Nickname: Panthers
- Newspaper: The Profile
- Yearbook: Mural
- Website: Proviso West High School

Proviso West High School (PWHS) is a public high school located in Hillside, Illinois, United States. It is a part of Proviso Township High Schools District 209, and was opened in 1958. Its sister schools are Proviso East High School and Proviso Mathematics and Science Academy.

The school is located approximately ten miles (16 km) west of metropolitan Chicago in Proviso Township. While the school's address is on Harrison Street, most of the school's property is adjacent to Wolf Road, while the southern part of the property lies along Roosevelt Road – which is also Illinois Route 38 at that point. The school is less than one mile from the interchange between I-290 and I-88 (referred to locally as the Hillside Strangler).

Proviso West High School serves seven villages within the township: Bellwood, Berkeley, Broadview, Hillside, part of Northlake, Stone Park, Westchester, and part of Melrose Park.

The current principal is Mr. Jeremy Christian.

== History ==
Prior to the opening of Proviso West, all students in the district attended Proviso High School (which became Proviso East when Proviso West was opened).

In 1953, researchers from the University of Chicago recommended that the school district begin planning to expand, and school district officials began examining the purchase of land for a new school. By 1955, the school population had grown to over 3,400 students, with an estimated increase to over 6,500 students by 1956. In June 1955, the board accepted a recommendation to purchase a 60 acre site in the town of Hillside, and planned a bond issue for the autumn. The construction of the school would also take up nine holes of the Hillside Golf Club. In November, the bond issue was approved by a 5900–626 vote.

In the summer and autumn of 1956, the district began accepting bids for construction of the new school which was to be designed by Perkins and Will. The original designs for the school called for a maximum capacity of 2,500 students. The school would have two three-story academic wings, a two-story wing that would house a library and administrative offices, a single-story wing for maintenance, cafeteria, shops, and art rooms, as well as a two-story gymnasium. A one-story auto shop facility would be built as separate building. The gymnasium was to include a spectator gym with main floor and balcony seating and a swimming pool.

As construction neared, there were changes made to the designs. The school was now designed to be expandable up to a maximum of 4000 students. The gymnasium area was now to consist of four smaller gyms that could be combined into a spectator gym with seating for 4000, in addition to a wrestling room, an orthopedic gym, a dance studio, nine locker rooms. The cafeteria, auditorium, and boiler rooms were specifically designed for expansion. The cost at the start of construction was US$5 million. The school opened after a cost of just under US$7.5 million.

In March 1960, the board of education began examining the need to expand Proviso West (including the addition of a fieldhouse). In June, the US$3.5 million bond issue was voted on.

In 1961, the district shifted an attendance boundary so that more students from Bellwood could attend Proviso West, in order to even out the student populations between the two buildings. The referendum was defeated, but a classroom addition began construction in early 1962 with money being taken from the operating fund.

In the 1990s a group of parents in Westchester, citing what they believed to be poor academic achievement and a large size of Proviso West, tried to remove their area from the district and form a small high school district of their own. In the six county Chicago metropolitan area, as of 1996, Proviso West ranked no. 126 in a ranking of 132 suburban high schools on the American College Test (ACT).

== Academics ==
Proviso West's class of 2008 had an average composite ACT score of 16.7. 77.5% of the senior class graduated. Proviso West did not make Adequate Yearly Progress (AYP) on the Prairie State Achievement Examination, which with the ACT comprises the state assessments used to fulfill the federal No Child Left Behind Act. Neither the school overall, nor any of its four student subgroups met expectations in reading or mathematics. The school is listed as being in its fifth year of academic watch.

== Athletics ==
Proviso West competes in the West Suburban Conference. The school is a member of the Illinois High School Association (IHSA), which governs most sports and competitive activities in the state. Teams are stylized as the Panthers.

The school sponsors interscholastic teams for young men and women in basketball, cross country, golf, soccer, swimming & diving, tennis, track & field, and volleyball. Young men may compete in baseball, football, and wrestling, while young women may compete in bowling, cheerleading, and softball. Calvin Davis was named athletic director at Proviso West in July 2013 after spending the previous ten years as Director of Sports Administration for the Chicago Public Schools.

The following teams have finished in the top four of their respective IHSA sponsored state championship tournaments or meets:

- Baseball: State Champions (1978–79)
- Cross Country (boys): 4th place (1974–75); 2nd place (1967–68); State Champions (1964–65)
- Gymnastics (boys): 4th place (1976–77)
- Track & Field (boys): 4th place (1980–81, 1990–91); 2nd place (1964–65); State Champions (1967–68)
- Track & Field (girls): 4th place (1976–77); 3rd place (1996–97, 1997–98); 2nd place (1998–99)
- Chess: State Champions (1980–82, 1986)

In March 1960, the U.S. Badminton Open, which included 300 players from the United States, Indonesia, India, and Denmark, among others, was hosted by Proviso West.

=== Proviso West Holiday Tournament ===
Since 1961, Proviso West has been the host of an annual boys basketball tournament in December; the first holiday basketball tournament in the Chicago area. Over that time, over 30 players who played in the tournament have gone on to professional athletic careers. Between 1964 and 2008, 95 teams qualified for the IHSA state tournament the same year they participated in the Proviso West Holiday Tournament (13 of which won the state title that year).

== Notable alumni ==
- Flozell Adams, NFL All-Pro offensive tackle (1998–2010), played with the Dallas Cowboys and Pittsburgh Steelers
- Lee Archambault, NASA astronaut, piloted (STS-117) and commanded (STS-119) in the Space Shuttle
- Steve Bannos, actor (Superbad, The 40-Year-Old Virgin, Pineapple Express)
- Robert Covington, basketball player for the NBA's Los Angeles Clippers
- Ray McElroy, NFL defensive back (1995–98, 2000–01), played most of his career with the Indianapolis Colts
- Jacquelyn Mitchard, journalist and author (The Deep End of the Ocean, A Theory of Relativity, Cage of Stars)
- Dick Murphy, mayor of San Diego, California (2000–05)
- Walter Parazaider, woodwind player; an original member of the Rock and Roll Hall of Fame band Chicago
- Kyle Prater, former football wide receiver for Northwestern
- Awvee Storey, NBA player (2004–06, 2007–08)
- Emanuel Chris Welch, 70th Speaker of the Illinois House of Representatives
- Robert Z'Dar, actor (Tango & Cash, Maniac Cop)
