= List of The New York Times number-one books of 1996 =

The American daily newspaper The New York Times publishes multiple weekly lists ranking the best selling books in the United States.

== Fiction ==
The following list ranks the number-one best selling fiction books, in the hardcover fiction category.

Date	Book	Author
January 7	The Christmas Box	Richard Paul Evans
January 14	The Christmas Box	Richard Paul Evans
January 21	The Horse Whisperer	Nicholas Evans
January 28	Intensity	Dean Koontz
February 4	Intensity	Dean Koontz
February 11	Intensity	Dean Koontz
February 18	Primary Colors	Anonymous; Later revealed to be Joe Klein
February 25	Primary Colors	Anonymous; Later revealed to be Joe Klein
March 3	Primary Colors	Anonymous; Later revealed to be Joe Klein
March 10	Primary Colors	Anonymous; Later revealed to be Joe Klein
March 17	Primary Colors	Anonymous; Later revealed to be Joe Klein
March 24	Primary Colors	Anonymous; Later revealed to be Joe Klein
March 31	Primary Colors	Anonymous; Later revealed to be Joe Klein
April 7	Primary Colors	Anonymous; Later revealed to be Joe Klein
April 14	Primary Colors	Anonymous; Later revealed to be Joe Klein
April 21	Moonlight Becomes You	Mary Higgins Clark
April 28	Moonlight Becomes You	Mary Higgins Clark
May 5	Moonlight Becomes You	Mary Higgins Clark
May 12	Moonlight Becomes You	Mary Higgins Clark
May 19	How Stella Got Her Groove Back	Terry McMillan
May 26	How Stella Got Her Groove Back	Terry McMillan
June 2	The Runaway Jury	John Grisham
June 9	The Runaway Jury	John Grisham
June 16	The Runaway Jury	John Grisham
June 23	The Runaway Jury	John Grisham
June 30	The Runaway Jury	John Grisham
July 7	The Runaway Jury	John Grisham
July 14	The Runaway Jury	John Grisham
July 21	Cause of Death	Patricia Cornwell
July 28	Cause of Death	Patricia Cornwell
August 4	Cause of Death	Patricia Cornwell
August 11	Cause of Death	Patricia Cornwell
August 18	Cause of Death	Patricia Cornwell
August 25	Servant of the Bones	Anne Rice
September 1	Executive Orders	Tom Clancy
September 8	Executive Orders	Tom Clancy
September 15	Executive Orders	Tom Clancy
September 22	Executive Orders	Tom Clancy
September 29	Executive Orders	Tom Clancy
October 6	The Deep End of the Ocean	Jacquelyn Mitchard
October 13	Desperation	Stephen King
October 20	Desperation	Stephen King
October 27	The Deep End of the Ocean	Jacquelyn Mitchard
November 3	The Deep End of the Ocean	Jacquelyn Mitchard
November 10	The Deep End of the Ocean	Jacquelyn Mitchard
November 17	The Deep End of the Ocean	Jacquelyn Mitchard
November 24	The Deep End of the Ocean	Jacquelyn Mitchard
December 1	Silent Honor	Danielle Steel
December 8	Silent Honor	Danielle Steel
December 15	Silent Honor	Danielle Steel
December 22	Silent Honor	Danielle Steel
December 29	Airframe	Michael Crichton

== Nonfiction ==
The following list ranks the number-one best selling nonfiction books, in the hardcover nonfiction category.

Date	Book	Author
January 7	The Road Ahead	Bill Gates with Nathan Myhrvold and Peter Rinearson
January 14	The Road Ahead	Bill Gates with Nathan Myhrvold and Peter Rinearson
January 21	The Road Ahead	Bill Gates with Nathan Myhrvold and Peter Rinearson
January 28	The Road Ahead	Bill Gates with Nathan Myhrvold and Peter Rinearson
February 4	It Takes a Village	Hillary Rodham Clinton
February 11	It Takes a Village	Hillary Rodham Clinton
February 18	It Takes a Village	Hillary Rodham Clinton
February 25	Rush Limbaugh Is a Big Fat Idiot	Al Franken
March 3	Rush Limbaugh Is a Big Fat Idiot	Al Franken
March 10	Rush Limbaugh Is a Big Fat Idiot	Al Franken
March 17	Rush Limbaugh Is a Big Fat Idiot	Al Franken
March 24	Rush Limbaugh Is a Big Fat Idiot	Al Franken
March 31	Blood Sport	James B. Stewart
April 7	In Contempt	Christopher A. Darden with Jess Walter
April 14	In Contempt	Christopher A. Darden with Jess Walter
April 21	In Contempt	Christopher A. Darden with Jess Walter
April 28	In Contempt	Christopher A. Darden with Jess Walter
May 5	In Contempt	Christopher A. Darden with Jess Walter
May 12	In Contempt	Christopher A. Darden with Jess Walter
May 19	Bad as I Wanna Be	Dennis Rodman with Tim Keown
May 26	Bad as I Wanna Be	Dennis Rodman with Tim Keown
June 2	Bad as I Wanna Be	Dennis Rodman with Tim Keown
June 9	Bad as I Wanna Be	Dennis Rodman with Tim Keown
June 16	Bad as I Wanna Be	Dennis Rodman with Tim Keown
June 23	Bad as I Wanna Be	Dennis Rodman with Tim Keown
June 30	Bad as I Wanna Be	Dennis Rodman with Tim Keown
July 7	Bad as I Wanna Be	Dennis Rodman with Tim Keown
July 14	Outrage	Vincent Bugliosi
July 21	Outrage	Vincent Bugliosi
July 28	The Dilbert Principle	Scott Adams
August 4	Unlimited Access	Gary Aldrich
August 11	Unlimited Access	Gary Aldrich
August 18	Unlimited Access	Gary Aldrich
August 25	The Dilbert Principle	Scott Adams
September 1	The Dilbert Principle	Scott Adams
September 8	Unlimited Access	Gary Aldrich
September 15	The Dilbert Principle	Scott Adams
September 22	The Dilbert Principle	Scott Adams
September 29	The Dilbert Principle	Scott Adams
October 6	The Dilbert Principle	Scott Adams
October 13	The Dilbert Principle	Scott Adams
October 20	The Dilbert Principle	Scott Adams
October 27	The Dilbert Principle	Scott Adams
November 3	The Dilbert Principle	Scott Adams
November 10	American Tragedy	Lawrence Schiller and James Willwerth
November 17	The Soul's Code	James Hillman
November 24	My Sergei	Ekaterina Gordeeva with E. M. Swift
December 1	The Soul's Code	James Hillman
December 8	The Soul's Code	James Hillman
December 15	Angela's Ashes	Frank McCourt
December 22	My Sergei	Ekaterina Gordeeva with E. M. Swift
December 29	A Reporter's Life	Walter Cronkite

== See also ==
- Publishers Weekly list of bestselling novels in the United States in the 1990s
