= The Deep End of the Ocean (film) =

1999 film by Ulu Grosbard

- Theatrical release poster
- Directed by: Ulu Grosbard
- Screenplay by: Stephen Schiff
- Based on: The Deep End of the Ocean by Jacquelyn Mitchard
- Produced by: Kate Guinzburg; Steve Nicolaides
- Starring: Michelle Pfeiffer; Treat Williams; Jonathan Jackson; John Kapelos; Whoopi Goldberg
- Cinematography: Stephen Goldblatt
- Edited by: John Bloom
- Music by: Elmer Bernstein
- Production companies: Columbia Pictures; Mandalay Entertainment
- Distributed by: Sony Pictures Releasing
- Release date: March 12, 1999
- Running time: 108 minutes
- Country: United States
- Language: English
- Budget: $38 million
- Box office: $28 million

The Deep End of the Ocean is a 1999 American drama film directed by Ulu Grosbard, and starring Michelle Pfeiffer, Treat Williams, Jonathan Jackson, John Kapelos, and Whoopi Goldberg. It is based on the 1996 novel by Jacquelyn Mitchard, a bestseller that was the first novel selected by Oprah Winfrey to be discussed on Oprah's Book Club in 1996.

The film tells the story of a family's reaction when Ben, the youngest son, is kidnapped and then found nine years later, living in the same town where his family had just moved.

The film was released in theaters on March 12, 1999, by Columbia Pictures, received mixed to poor reviews and was a box-office flop, grossing $28 million worldwide.

== Plot ==
During her high school reunion in a crowded hotel lobby, Beth Cappadora's 3-year-old son Ben vanishes after his older brother Vincent fails to keep an eye on him. Police are called to the scene as a frantic search begins but it is unsuccessful, and Beth experiences a nervous breakdown. Unable to cope with her devastation, she unintentionally neglects their other two children, Vincent and Kerry.

After nine years, the Cappadora family has seemingly accepted that Ben has gone forever, when a familiar-looking boy turns up at their new house offering to mow their lawn. He introduces himself as Sam Karras, but Beth becomes convinced he is Ben. She alerts the police and an investigation begins.

Beth discovers Ben was kidnapped at the reunion by Cecilia Lockhart, a mentally unstable woman who was an old classmate of Beth's. She brought Ben up as her own child until she took her own life five years later. Ben, now Sam, had since been living with Cecilia's husband George who adopted him after they met, believing the child was hers.

Sam is returned to the Cappadora family but the attempted reintegration produces painful results for everyone. So, Beth and her husband Pat eventually decide to return him to his adoptive father. Their marriage suffers as a result over time and they begin sleeping in separate beds.

One night Vincent, now a troubled teenager distant from his parents, leaves the house during the night and ends up in jail after a drunk driving incident. Beth and Pat discuss his erratic behavior with Candace "Candy" Bliss, the detective in Ben's case who became a family friend. She reassures Beth that Vincent loves her. They eventually reconcile their relationship.

Sam visits Vincent in jail and reveals he has remembered something from before his abduction; he was playing hide and seek with Vincent and got stuck in a trunk, but Vincent found him, which made him feel safe. Sam calls him his brother and asks if they can be friends.

Pat later bails Vincent out of jail and, one night, finds him playing basketball outside with Sam. Vincent, who has carried guilt for not watching Ben at the reunion, letting go of his hand and telling him to get lost, is forgiven by his little brother. Sam tells him he has decided to move back to live with the Cappadoras. They play a game of basketball, stating the loser has to carry Sam's remarkably heavy suitcase into the house. The newly reconciled Beth and Pat watch happily from the living room window.

== Cast ==
- Michelle Pfeiffer as Beth Cappadora
- Treat Williams as Pat Cappadora
- Whoopi Goldberg as Detective Candace "Candy" Bliss
- Jonathan Jackson as Vincent Cappadora – Age 16
  - Cory Buck as Vincent Cappadora – Age 7
- Ryan Merriman as Benjamin Cappadora/Sam Karras – Age 12
  - Michael McElroy as Benjamin Cappadora – Age 3
- Alexa Vega as Kerry Cappadora – Age 9
- Michael McGrady as Jimmy Daugherty
- Brenda Strong as Ellen, Beth's high school classmate
- Tony Musante as Grandpa Angelo Cappadora
- Rose Gregorio as Grandma Rosie Cappadora
- John Kapelos as George Karras, Cecilia's husband
- Lucinda Jenney as Laurie
- John Roselius as Chief Bastokovich
- Robert Cicchini as Uncle Joey

== Production ==
According to a small behind-the-scenes booklet featured on the DVD release, the film began production on October 27, 1997, and was predominantly shot in Los Angeles. Oprah Winfrey was considered for the role of Det. Candace "Candy" Bliss before Whoopi Goldberg was cast. Coincidentally, the novel on which this movie is based was the very first book selected by Winfrey to be discussed on Oprah's Book Club in 1996.

The original ending of the book, which was Michelle Pfeiffer's preferred ending, was filmed but was received poorly by test audiences who felt it was too grim. This prompted the studio to go for a more conventional happy ending, which resulted in the film being pushed back from a planned 1998 Fall release to Spring 1999.

== Release ==
The film was theatrically released on March 12, 1999.

== Reception ==
The Deep End of the Ocean holds an approval rating of 42% on review aggregator website Rotten Tomatoes, based on 36 reviews, with an average rating of 5.8/10. The film has a weighted average score of 45 out of 100 on Metacritic, based on 28 critics, indicating "mixed or average reviews". Audiences polled by CinemaScore gave the film an average grade of "C+" on an A+ to F scale.

In The New York Times, Janet Maslin praised the director and lead actress but criticised the music: "With a fine, impassioned performance from Michelle Pfeiffer as the story's raw-nerved heroine, the film moves beyond the detective-story aspects of its material to concentrate on what kind of shock waves batter a family after an event like this... Grosbard mercifully avoids melodrama. And he paces the film so simply and determinedly that its early scenes are like a string of picture postcards, each one depicting a new phase of the family's ordeal. Only when the film seeks tidy resolution for a tangled set of problems does this restraint seem overwhelmed by the complexity of the situation. But the only real false notes are musical ones, from a score by Elmer Bernstein that turns familiar and trite when the film does not."

In Variety, Emanuel Levy praised all aspects of the film: "Michelle Pfeiffer and Treat Williams give such magnetic performances that they elevate the film way above its middlebrow sensibility and proclivity for neat resolutions... In the first reel, Pfeiffer is brilliant as an anxious mother consumed with finding her lost son. Dominating scene after scene, she conveys anguish and guilt in an all-out performance that ranks with her best... Coming from the theater, Grosbard has always coaxed strong performances from his handpicked casts, but Deep End's technical sheen places this outing at the top of his oeuvre. Stephen Goldblatt's clean lensing, Elmer Bernstein's evocative score, Dan Davis' crafty production design, Susie DeSanto's authentic costumes and, particularly, John Bloom's fluent editing serve as models for efficient storytelling, representing mainstream cinema at its best."

In the San Francisco Chronicle, Edward Guthmann commended Pfeiffer and Jackson but was ultimately unimpressed: "Pfeiffer, who segued into mother roles in her past two films, One Fine Day and A Thousand Acres, brings heart and soul to this domestic melodrama, but it's not enough. The Deep End of the Ocean has nothing but the noblest of intentions, and Grosbard's direction is meticulous, sober and tasteful, but the movie is so deliberate, so enervated that you feel as if you're watching it through glass... In a difficult role that he doesn't quite pull off, Ryan Merriman plays Sam, the 12-year-old whose allegiance is split between two homes. As his damaged older brother, Jonathan Jackson brings such confidence, maturity and self-possession that he seems to belong in another movie. And Whoopi Goldberg - all-purpose, you-got-a-part-I'll-play-it Whoopi - shows up as a helpful detective named Candy Bliss."

In Rolling Stone, Peter Travers held a similar view: "The Deep End of the Ocean, from Jacquelyn Mitchard's best-selling novel about parents who find their lost son nine years after his abduction, benefits from a customarily fine performance by Michelle Pfeiffer as the boy's mother. Treat Williams excels as the husband, as does Whoopi Goldberg, a detective who helps the parents in their search. Director Ulu Grosbard (Georgia) and screenwriter Stephen Schiff (Lolita) commendably try to avoid the usual kidnapping clichés in favor of family dynamics, but the film ultimately gives in to a case of TV-movie blahs."

In Entertainment Weekly, Michael Sauter also found the lead performances superior to the film as a whole: "The first half of this drama, with Pfeiffer and Williams as parents whose 3-year-old son vanishes, is almost unbearably wrenching... Far less effective, however, is the rest of the story, set nine years later, when the boy resurfaces... But if the film was less than satisfying as a big-screen event, it's still worth renting for Pfeiffer, who valiantly portrays the devastating complexities of grief and guilt."

Two extremely negative reviews came from Roger Ebert in the Chicago Sun-Times and Desson Howe in The Washington Post. Ebert wrote that "Ulu Grosbard's The Deep End of the Ocean is a painfully stolid movie that lumbers past emotional issues like a wrestler in a cafeteria line, putting a little of everything on his plate. It provides big roles for Michelle Pfeiffer and Treat Williams, but doesn't provide them with the screenplay support they need; the result is that awkwardness when characters express emotions that the audience doesn't share." Howe described the "moments in The Deep End of the Ocean that will break your heart. After all, the movie – based on Jacquelyn Mitchard's novel – is about losing a child. This is, essentially, emotional blackmail for anyone with a family. Two hundred monkeys fighting over one word processor could make you cry over material like that. Yet producer/star Michelle Pfeiffer, director Ulu Grosbard and scriptwriter Stephen Schiff still mess things up. Apart from the previously mentioned occasions, and nice performances from Jonathan Jackson and Ryan Merriman, the movie's a floating longboat that ought to be ignited and pushed out to sea, Viking style."

== Music ==
Elmer Bernstein's original score to The Deep End of the Ocean was released in 1999 by Milan Records.

Track listing

1. Main Title - 5:10
2. Brothers - 2:33
3. Sam is Lost - 3:59
4. Home Again - 4:13
5. Photographs - 2:24
6. Cecil - 2:25
7. Giving Back - 3:05
8. Reunion - 3:06
9. End Credits - 3:08

== Awards and nominations ==
Ryan Merriman won a Young Artist Award for Best Performance in a Feature Film - Supporting Young Actor.

== Home media ==
The film was released in DVD and VHS on August 10, 1999. The film was released as part of a Blu-ray Disc double feature with Stepmom from Mill Creek Entertainment on June 4, 2019.
