= Oprah's Book Club =

Talk show segment of books chosen by Oprah Winfrey

Eckhart Tolle joins Oprah to discuss his book A New Earth as part of a live webcast series on Oprah.com.

Oprah's Book Club was a book discussion club segment of the American talk show The Oprah Winfrey Show, highlighting books chosen by host Oprah Winfrey. Winfrey started the book club in 1996, selecting a new book, usually a novel, for viewers to read and discuss each month. In total, the club recommended 70 books during its 15 years.

Due to the book club's widespread popularity, many obscure titles have become very popular bestsellers, increasing sales in some cases by as many as several million copies. Al Greco, a Fordham University marketing professor, estimated the total sales of the 70 "Oprah editions" at over 55 million copies.

The club has seen several literary controversies, such as Jonathan Franzen's public dissatisfaction with his novel, The Corrections, having been chosen by Winfrey, and the incident of James Frey's memoir, A Million Little Pieces, being outed as almost entirety fabricated. The latter controversy resulted in Frey and the book's publisher Nan A. Talese being confronted and publicly shamed by Winfrey in a highly praised live televised episode of Winfrey's show.

On June 1, 2012, Oprah announced the launch of Oprah's Book Club 2.0 with Wild by Cheryl Strayed. The new version of Oprah's Book Club, a joint project between OWN: The Oprah Winfrey Network and O, The Oprah Magazine, incorporates the use of various social media platforms and e-readers.

On March 25, 2019, Apple Inc. and Oprah announced a revival of Oprah's Book Club that aired on Apple TV+.

== History ==
The book club's first selection on September 17, 1996, was the then recently published novel The Deep End of the Ocean by Jacquelyn Mitchard. Winfrey discontinued the book club for one year in 2002, stating that she could not keep up with the required reading while still searching for contemporary novels that she enjoyed. After its revival in 2003, books were selected on a more limited basis (three or four a year).

Winfrey returned to fiction with her 2007 selections of The Road by Cormac McCarthy in March and Middlesex by Jeffrey Eugenides in June. Shortly after its being chosen, The Road was awarded the Pulitzer Prize for Fiction. Winfrey conducted the first ever television interview with McCarthy, a famously reclusive author, on June 5, 2007.

The October 2007 selection was Love in the Time of Cholera, a 1985 novel by Nobel Prize laureate Gabriel García Márquez, greatly furthering not only the influence of the author in North America, but that of his translator Edith Grossman. Another work by Márquez, One Hundred Years of Solitude, was a previous selection for the book club in 2004.

The last club selection was a special edition of Charles Dickens' A Tale of Two Cities and Great Expectations. It had disappointingly low sales figures.

== Influence ==
In Reading with Oprah: The Book Club That Changed America, Kathleen Rooney describes Winfrey as "a serious American intellectual who pioneered the use of electronic media, specifically television and the Internet, to take reading—a decidedly non-technological and highly individual act—and highlight its social elements and uses in such a way to motivate millions of erstwhile non-readers to pick up books."

Business Week stated:

Perhaps the most astonishing aspect of the Oprah phenomenon is how outsized her power is compared with that of other market movers. Some observers suggest that Jon Stewart of Comedy Central's The Daily Show could be No. 2. Other proven arm-twisters include Fox News's Sean Hannity, National Public Radio's Terry Gross, radio personality Don Imus, and CBS' 60 Minutes. But no one comes close to Oprah's clout: Publishers estimate that her power to sell a book is anywhere from 20 to 100 times that of any other media personality.

According to a 2005 paper in Publishing Research Quarterly, every book chosen by Oprah's Book Club between 1996 and 2002 appeared on the USA Today Best-Selling Books list "for at least a few months" following its selection.

In 2009, it was reported that the influence of Winfrey's book club had even spread to Brazil, with picks like A New Earth dominating Brazil's best-seller list.

The club generated so much success for some books that they went on to be adapted into films. This subset includes The Deep End of the Ocean and The Reader.

At the show's conclusion in May 2011, Nielsen BookScan created a list of the top-10 bestsellers from the club's final 10 years (prior data was unavailable). The top four with sales figures as of May 2011:

1. Eckhart Tolle, A New Earth (2005), 3,370,000 copies
2. James Frey, A Million Little Pieces, 2,695,500 copies
3. Elie Wiesel, Night, 2,021,000 copies
4. Cormac McCarthy, The Road, 1,385,000 copies

In a 2014 paper by economist Craig L. Garthwaite published in American Economic Journal: Applied Economics, it was reported that while the book club increased sales of individual titles in the list, it caused a short-term overall decrease in sales for the book industry as a whole after each selection was announced. Since Oprah's selections were longer and more difficult classics that demanded greater time and energy to read, those people who were reading Oprah's books were not buying their usual fare of genre books: "there were statistically significant decreases for mysteries and action/adventure novels. Romances also saw a sales decline," following an Oprah endorsement. In the 12 weeks following an endorsement, "weekly adult fiction book sales decreased by a statistically significant 2.5 percent."

== Critical reception ==
The club has received critical commentaries from the literary community.

Scott Stossel, an editor at The Atlantic, wrote:

There is something so relentlessly therapeutic, so consciously self-improving about the book club that it seems antithetical to discussions of serious literature. Literature should disturb the mind and derange the senses; it can be palliative, but it is not meant to be the easy, soothing one that Oprah would make it.

According to Alyson Miller, Winfrey’s role in publicly endorsing a series of literary frauds, including James Frey, Herman Rosenblat's Angel at the Fence (planned to be published in 2009 but cancelled) and Margaret B. Jones' Love and Consequences (2008), highlights how literary value is shaped by celebrity endorsement, market forces, and mass media rather than elite institutions alone. Fake memoir scandals are according to Miller revealing because many achieved enormous commercial success before exposure, demonstrating the power of the "Oprah Effect," whereby book club selections gain instant authority and visibility. Much of Winfrey’s promoted literature centred on trauma, survival, and marginalised identities, aligning literary prestige with moral seriousness and ethical consumption.

Similarly, academic writer Anne Rothe contends that Winfrey’s book club and talk show helped transform misery memoirs of autobiographical suffering into a morally elevated, commercially successful genre. She discusses Winfrey in the context of popular trauma culture and argues that daytime talk shows like Oprah turn personal suffering into "trauma kitsch"—a melodramatic, commodified representation of pain and victimhood that mirrors the sensational structure of modern media narratives. Rothe places Oprah’s show alongside other mass-media genres to show how victimhood and suffering are packaged as spectacle, contributing to cultural patterns that shape how audiences consume stories of trauma and identity in American society.

== Controversies ==
=== Jonathan Franzen ===
Jonathan Franzen felt conflicted about his book The Corrections being chosen as a book club selection. After the announcement was made, he expressed distaste with being in the company of other Oprah's Book Club authors, saying in an interview that Winfrey had "picked some good books, but she's picked enough schmaltzy, one-dimensional ones that I cringe, myself, even though I think she's really smart and she's really fighting the good fight." Franzen added that his novel was a "hard book for that audience."

Following the criticism Franzen was uninvited from the televised book club dinner, and he apologized profusely. When Franzen was not invited back, he suggested that perhaps he and Winfrey could still have dinner but not on TV, but Winfrey was all booked up, and her spokesperson said she was moving on.

Other writers were critical of Franzen. Writing in The New York Times, author Verlyn Klinkenborg suggested that "lurking behind Mr. Franzen's rejection of Ms. Winfrey is an elemental distrust of readers, except for the ones he designates." Author Andre Dubus III wrote that, "It is so elitist it offends me deeply. The assumption that high art is not for the masses, that they won't understand it and they don't deserve it – I find that reprehensible. Is that a judgment on the audience? Or on the books in whose company he would be?"

In 2010, Oprah chose another of Franzen's books, Freedom, for her book club. She said that after she read a copy of the book Franzen had sent her with a note, she called the author and gained his permission. Oprah said, "we have a little history this author and I", but called the book "a masterpiece", and according to an article in the Los Angeles Times, she "seems to have forgiven the bestselling author after their 2001 kerfuffle".

=== James Frey ===
In late 2005 and early 2006, Oprah's Book Club was again involved in controversy. Winfrey selected James Frey's A Million Little Pieces for the September 2005 selection. Pieces is a book billed as a memoir—a true account of Frey's life as an alcoholic, drug addict, and criminal. It became the Book Club's greatest selling book up to that point, and many readers spoke of how the account helped free them from drugs as well. But the additional attention focused on Frey's memoir soon led to critics questioning the validity of Frey's supposedly true account, especially regarding his treatment while in a rehabilitation facility and his stories of time spent in jail. Initially, Frey convinced Larry King that the embellishments in his book were of a sort that could be found in any literary memoir; Winfrey encouraged debate about how creative non-fiction should be classified, and cited the inspirational impact Frey's work had had on so many of her viewers. But as more accusations against the book surfaced, Winfrey invited Frey on the show to find out directly from him whether he had lied to her and her viewers. During a heated live televised debate, Winfrey forced Frey to admit that he had indeed lied about spending time in jail, and that he had no idea whether he had two root canals without painkillers or not, despite devoting several pages to describing them in excruciating detail. Winfrey then brought out the book's publisher Nan A. Talese to defend her decision to classify the book as a memoir, and forced Talese to admit that she had done nothing to check the book's veracity, despite the fact that her representatives had assured Winfrey's staff that the book was indeed non-fiction and described it as "brutally honest" in a press release.

The media commented on the televised showdown. David Carr of The New York Times wrote: "Both Mr. Frey and Ms. Talese were snapped in two like dry winter twigs." "Oprah annihilates Frey," proclaimed Larry King. New York Times columnist Maureen Dowd wrote, "It was a huge relief, after our long national slide into untruth and no consequences, into swift boating and swift bucks, into W.'s delusion and denial, to see the Empress of Empathy icily hold someone accountable for lying," and The Washington Post's Richard Cohen was so impressed by the confrontation, that he crowned Winfrey "Mensch of the Year."

== Oprah's Book Club selections ==
Date	Title	Author	Reference
September 1996	The Deep End of the Ocean	Jacquelyn Mitchard	
October 1996	Song of Solomon	Toni Morrison	
November 1996	The Book of Ruth	Jane Hamilton	
December 1996	She's Come Undone	Wally Lamb	
February 1997	Stones from the River	Ursula Hegi	
April 1997	The Rapture of Canaan	Sheri Reynolds	
May 1997	The Heart of a Woman	Maya Angelou	
June 1997	Songs In Ordinary Time	Mary McGarry Morris	
September 1997	A Lesson Before Dying	Ernest J. Gaines	
October 1997	A Virtuous Woman; Ellen Foster	Kaye Gibbons	
December 1997	The Meanest Thing To Say; The Treasure Hunt; The Best Way to Play	Bill Cosby	
January 1998	Paradise	Toni Morrison	
March 1998	Here on Earth	Alice Hoffman	
April 1998	Black and Blue	Anna Quindlen	
May 1998	Breath, Eyes, Memory	Edwidge Danticat	
June 1998	I Know This Much Is True	Wally Lamb	
September 1998	What Looks Like Crazy on an Ordinary Day	Pearl Cleage	
October 1998	Midwives	Chris Bohjalian	
December 1998	Where the Heart Is	Billie Letts	
January 1999	Jewel	Bret Lott	
February 1999	The Reader	Bernhard Schlink	
March 1999	The Pilot's Wife	Anita Shreve	
May 1999	White Oleander	Janet Fitch	
June 1999	Mother of Pearl	Melinda Haynes	
September 1999	Tara Road	Maeve Binchy	
October 1999	River, Cross My Heart	Breena Clarke	
November 1999	Vinegar Hill	A. Manette Ansay	
December 1999	A Map of the World	Jane Hamilton	
January 2000	Gap Creek	Robert Morgan	
February 2000	Daughter of Fortune	Isabel Allende	
March 2000	Back Roads	Tawni O'Dell	
April 2000	The Bluest Eye	Toni Morrison	
May 2000	While I Was Gone	Sue Miller	
June 2000	The Poisonwood Bible	Barbara Kingsolver	
August 2000	Open House	Elizabeth Berg	
September 2000	Drowning Ruth	Christina Schwarz	
November 2000	House of Sand and Fog	Andre Dubus III	
January 2001	We Were the Mulvaneys	Joyce Carol Oates	
March 2001	Icy Sparks	Gwyn Hyman Rubio	
May 2001	Stolen Lives: Twenty Years in a Desert Jail	Malika Oufkir; Michèle Fitoussi	
June 2001	Cane River	Lalita Tademy	
September 2001	The Corrections	Jonathan Franzen	
November 2001	A Fine Balance	Rohinton Mistry	
January 2002	Fall on Your Knees	Ann-Marie MacDonald	
April 2002	Sula	Toni Morrison	
June 2003	East of Eden	John Steinbeck	
September 2003	Cry, The Beloved Country	Alan Paton	
January 2004	One Hundred Years of Solitude	Gabriel García Márquez	
April 2004	The Heart Is a Lonely Hunter	Carson McCullers	
May 2004	Anna Karenina	Leo Tolstoy	
September 2004	The Good Earth	Pearl S. Buck	
June 2005	The Sound and the Fury; As I Lay Dying; Light in August	William Faulkner	
September 2005	A Million Little Pieces	James Frey	
January 2006	Night	Elie Wiesel	
January 2007	The Measure of a Man: A Spiritual Autobiography	Sidney Poitier	
March 2007	The Road	Cormac McCarthy	
June 2007	Middlesex	Jeffrey Eugenides	
October 2007	Love in the Time of Cholera	Gabriel García Márquez	
November 2007	The Pillars of the Earth	Ken Follett	
January 2008	A New Earth: Awakening to Your Life's Purpose	Eckhart Tolle	
September 2008	The Story of Edgar Sawtelle	David Wroblewski	
September 2009	Say You're One of Them	Uwem Akpan	
September 2010	Freedom	Jonathan Franzen	
December 2010	Great Expectations; A Tale of Two Cities	Charles Dickens	

The original book club ended with the conclusion of The Oprah Winfrey Show in 2011. See Oprah's Book Club 2.0 for the selections of the club's 2012 relaunch.

== Streaming television series ==
On March 25, 2019, Apple Inc. and Oprah announced a revival of Oprah's Book Club that was released on Apple TV+.
