= Flozell Adams =

American football player (born 1975)

Flozell Justin Adams
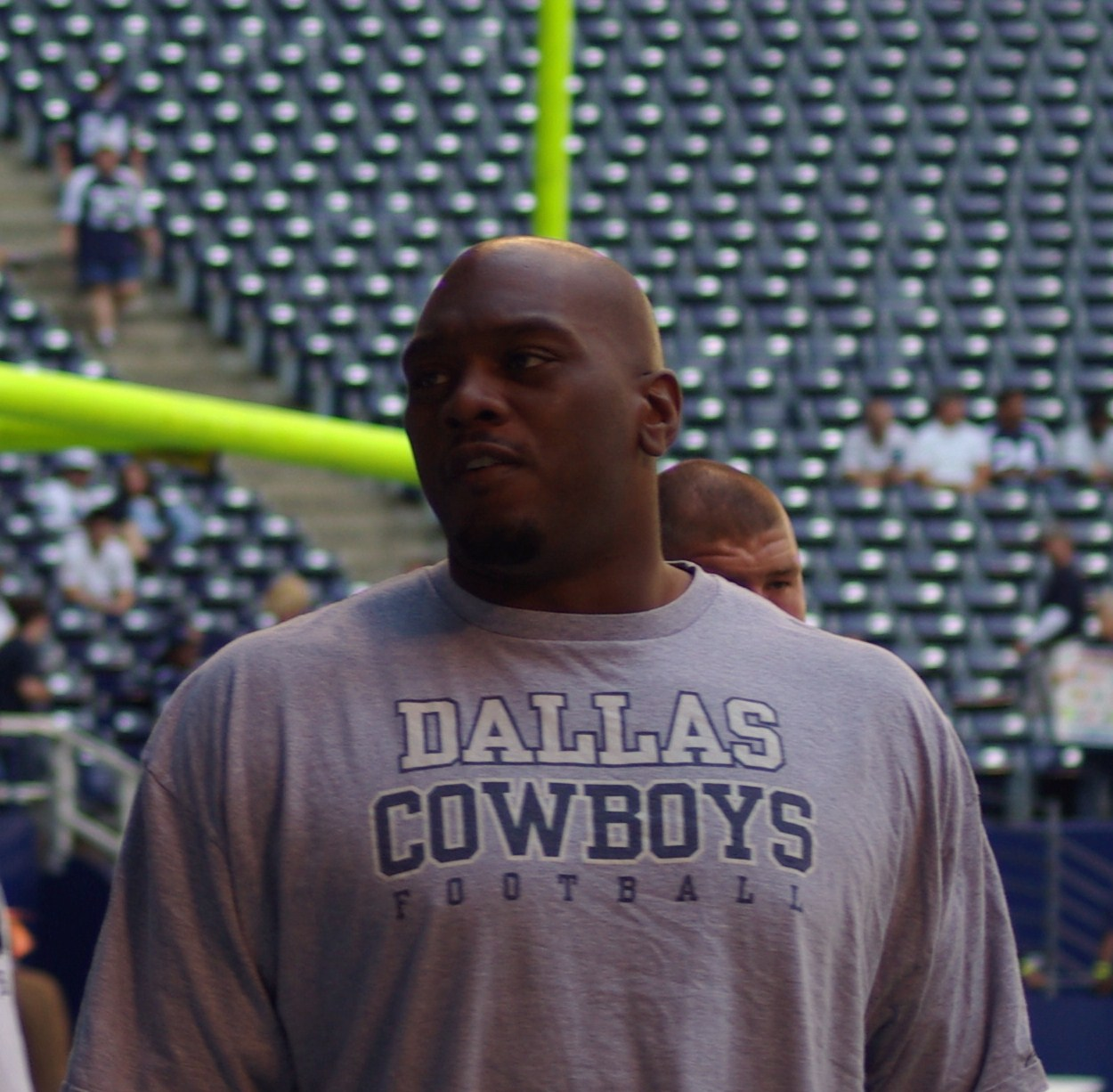
- Adams warming up at Texas Stadium in 2008

No. 76, 71
- Position: Offensive tackle

Personal information
- Born: May 18, 1975 (age 51); Bellwood, Illinois, U.S.
- Listed height: 6 ft 7 in (2.01 m)
- Listed weight: 338 lb (153 kg)

Career information
- High school: Proviso West (Hillside, Illinois)
- College: Michigan State (1994–1997)
- NFL draft: 1998: 2nd round, 38th overall pick

Career history
- Dallas Cowboys (1998–2009); Pittsburgh Steelers (2010)

Awards and highlights
- Second-team All-Pro (2007); 5× Pro Bowl (2003, 2004, 2006–2008); First-team All-American (1997); Big Ten Offensive Lineman of the Year (1997); First-team All-Big Ten (1997); Second-team All-Big Ten (1996)

Career NFL statistics
- Games played: 198
- Games started: 194
- Fumble recoveries: 10
- Stats at Pro Football Reference

Flozell Justin Adams (born May 18, 1975) is an American former professional football player who was an offensive tackle in the National Football League (NFL). He played college football for the Michigan State Spartans. He was selected by the Dallas Cowboys in the second round of the 1998 NFL draft, and also played for the Pittsburgh Steelers. Adams was a five-time Pro Bowl selection.

== Early life ==
At Proviso West High School, Adams played the trumpet for the school's band until his junior year when he took up football, becoming a two-year starter at left tackle, while receiving All-American and first-team All-State honors as a senior. He also earned four letters in track for the shot put and three letters in wrestling. His number 76 is only one of three numbers retired by the school, along with Ray McElroy and Awvee Storey. He also was involved in foreign language clubs.

== College career ==
Adams attended Michigan State University, where he played for coach Nick Saban's Michigan State Spartans football team from 1994 to 1997. His massive size (6-foot-7, 335-pounds) earned him the nickname "The Hotel", and served him well as a three-year starter (2 at right tackle and 1 at left tackle). After earning honorable mention All-Big Ten in 1995, he went on to develop into one of the best offensive linemen in the nation. As a junior in 1996, he was a second-team All-Big Ten selection. As a senior in 1997, he received All-America honors, was named the Big Ten offensive lineman of the Year, and was a semi-finalist for the Outland Trophy and the Lombardi Award. He also was invited to play in the East-West Shrine Game and the Senior Bowl.

== Professional career ==
=== Pre-draft ===
Pre-draft measurables
Height	Weight	Arm length	40-yard dash	Bench press
6 ft 7 3/8 in (2.02 m)	335 lb (152 kg)	36 1/2 in (0.93 m)	5.50 s	26 reps
All values from CNNSI,

=== Dallas Cowboys ===
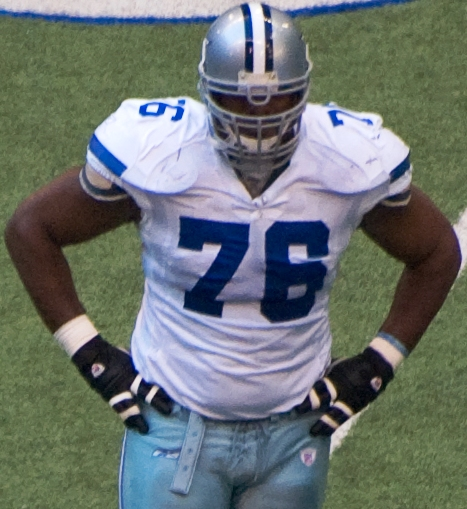
Adams in the huddle during a 2007 game against the Eagles.

Adams was drafted in the second round of the 1998 NFL draft by the Dallas Cowboys. He was expected to go higher, but questions about his partially deaf right ear and his athletic ability made teams wary of his potential value. He became a 10-game starter at right guard as a rookie, and as a second-year pro was moved to left tackle, where he played at a dependable level, but never distinguished himself.

On November 10, 1999, Duane Clemons was fined $7,500 for intentionally punching Adams in the testes following an interception two days earlier during a Monday Night Football game against the Minnesota Vikings. While Adams maintained that he didn't know why Clemons punched him, Clemons stated that he threw the punch because Adams illegally took him down from behind on an interception return.

It is believed 2002 was the first time an NFL franchise had five African American starters on their offensive line, when the Cowboys lined up rookie center Andre Gurode, tackles Adams and Solomon Page, guards Larry Allen and Kelvin Garmon. When Bill Parcells became the Cowboys head coach for the 2003 season, there were doubts about the fifth-year player's future with the team. Parcells made re-signing him a priority, which became a turning point in his career, that saw his performance improved to a level that earned him five Pro Bowl selections. In 2007 he earned All-Pro honors.

Adams tore his ACL in 2005 playing against the New York Giants and was out for the final 10 games of the season. On February 28, 2008, he signed a six-year contract with the Cowboys. It was in the neighborhood of $42 million, including $15 million in guaranteed money and about $13 million in signing bonus. In the 2009 season, Adams was fined several times for kicking at and tripping opponents. Adams also was part of an altercation with several Giants in their December 6, 2009, game at Giants Stadium after he pushed Justin Tuck from behind after a play had been blown dead, an action which drew review by the NFL and a fine of $50,000. As a result, a rule change was approved during the off-season where any personal foul that occurs after the clock expires during a half will result in a 15-yard penalty on the second half or overtime kickoff. Adams was criticized for his false start and holding penalties, being called for the second most penalties in the NFL between 2006 and 2009.

The Cowboys released Adams on April 2, 2010 in a salary cap move. He is often overlooked as one of the top offensive linemen in club history, but only Larry Allen (ten), Zack Martin (nine), Tyron Smith (eight), Rayfield Wright (six), Nate Newton (six), and John Niland (six) have more Pro Bowl selections among offensive line players. He was also a durable player, missing only 14 games in his 12-year career with Dallas.

=== Pittsburgh Steelers ===
On July 29, 2010, Adams agreed to a two-year deal with the Pittsburgh Steelers. He replaced starting right tackle Willie Colon, who suffered a season-ending injury (torn Achilles tendon). Adams's move to Pittsburgh landed him in Super Bowl XLV, where was a starter as the Steelers lost to the Green Bay Packers. He was released on July 29, 2011, after one season in Pittsburgh.
