= Back Roads (2018 film) =

- Theatrical poster
- Directed by: Alex Pettyfer
- Written by: Tawni O'Dell; Adrian Lyne
- Based on: Back Roads by Tawni O'Dell
- Produced by: Michael Ohoven; Craig Robinson; Alex Pettyfer; Ashley Mansour; Jake Seal; Dan Spilo
- Starring: Alex Pettyfer; Jennifer Morrison; Nicola Peltz; Robert Patrick; Juliette Lewis
- Cinematography: Jarin Blaschke
- Edited by: Kant Pan
- Music by: John Hunter
- Production companies: Upturn Productions; Infinity Films; Back Roads Production Ltd
- Distributed by: Samuel Goldwyn Films
- Release dates: April 20, 2018 (Tribeca Film Festival); December 7, 2018 (United States)
- Running time: 101 minutes
- Country: United States
- Language: English
- Budget: $2.2 million

Back Roads is a 2018 American drama film directed by Alex Pettyfer in his directorial debut. The screenplay by Tawni O'Dell and Adrian Lyne was adapted from O'Dell's bestselling novel of the same name. Starring Pettyfer, Jennifer Morrison, Nicola Peltz, Robert Patrick and Juliette Lewis, the film centers on Harley Altmeyer, a young man living in the Pennsylvania backwoods who must care for his three younger sisters after their mother Bonnie is arrested for murdering his father.

Back Roads premiered at the 2018 Tribeca Film Festival and was acquired by Samuel Goldwyn Films. It received a limited release in the United States on December 7, 2018, and was later released on video on demand and digital.

== Plot ==
In 1993, Bonnie Altmeyer goes to prison after confessing to the murder of her abusive husband. Her oldest child, Harley, is left to care for his three younger sisters in rural Pennsylvania. Harley forgoes his college education and – by 1995 – is working two dead-end jobs to pay the bills and raise his siblings, which include the rebellious and promiscuous Amber, the withdrawn and newly adolescent Misty, and the pre-teen Jody. Scarred by his past, Harley becomes infatuated with Callie Mercer, a ten-years-older married woman who lives nearby. Things take a dangerous turn when they embark on an affair.

Harley's sessions with therapist Betty Parks reveal that the father had been physically abusive to his children and had been sexually abusing Misty. When Harley confronts Bonnie in prison, she admits that Misty had been jealous of her and tried to shoot her but the father stepped in front of the rifle and died instead. When Harley confronts Misty, she tells him that he is the one who should have shot their father.

Harley and Amber have sex, the culmination of the touching that had happened between them while younger when they sought comfort from the abuse of their father. Their abusive upbringing, destroyed futures and family secrets consume the siblings; Amber, like Misty before her, shoots and kills the perceived threat to her incestuous happiness – Callie. Like Bonnie before him, Harley takes the blame and goes to prison.

== Cast ==
- Alex Pettyfer as Harley Altmeyer
- Jennifer Morrison as Callie
- Nicola Peltz as Amber Altmeyer
- Chiara Aurelia as Misty Altmeyer
- Hala Finley as Jody Altmeyer
- June Carryl as Betty
- Robert Patrick as Chief Mansour
- Juliette Lewis as Bonnie Altmeyer
- Robert Longstreet as Uncle Mike
- Jeff Pope as Rick

== Production ==
=== Development ===
On October 30, 2003, Frank Darabont was set to executive produce the feature film adaptation of Back Roads by Tawni O'Dell, with Todd Field possibly set to direct the screenplay and Anna Garduno and Barbara Trembley producing with Darabont’s Darkwoods Productions and on January 29, 2004, Darabont was likely attached to direct instead of Field and Paramount Pictures would handle film distribution. An adaptation of O'Dell's 1999 novel had been a long-gestating project for Adrian Lyne and was set to be his return to directing after a twenty-year absence. In 2011, Andrew Garfield, Jennifer Garner and Marcia Gay Harden were reportedly attached to star, with Lyne directing from a script he co-wrote with O'Dell.

In 2012, Garfield dropped out of the project due to scheduling conflicts with The Amazing Spider-Man. The project was later abandoned after financing fell through. Alex Pettyfer, who originally read for the role of Harley Altmeyer back in 2008, secured the rights to the novel with his production company Upturn Productions. Pettyfer initially had plans of only producing and acting in the film but after two unnamed directors passed on the film due to scheduling conflicts, Pettyfer stepped in to direct himself. Lyne remained as an executive producer.

When he was still attached as director, Lyne had envisioned the film as a big-budgeted studio effort that leaned more into the eroticized elements the director is known for. Pettyfer left out the more sexual elements in Lyne's original script and went in a darker direction that focused more on the "exploration of family drama" and trauma.

=== Filming ===
Filming took place in the town of St. Francisville in the Baton Rouge area of Louisiana, beginning in March 2017 and taking 19 days. Pettyfer chose to set the film in the 1990s, saying, "There’s only a pay phone, and you begin feeling more and more closed in. In the beginning, there are opening shots of landscape, but then it becomes darker and more confined."

== Release ==
The film premiered at the Tribeca Festival on April 20, 2018. On August 16, 2018, Samuel Goldwyn Films acquired North American distribution rights to the film. Back Roads was released on December 7, 2018, in select theaters and video on demand in the United States. A DVD release was issued on March 5, 2019. In the UK, the film was released to digital platforms on July 6, 2020.

=== Critical reception ===
On review aggregate website Rotten Tomatoes, 53% of the 30 reviews compiled are positive, with an average rating of 5.6/10. The website's critics consensus reads: "Uneven yet ultimately intriguing, Back Roads serves as a memorable calling card for star and debuting director Alex Pettyfer's talent behind the camera." Metacritic, which uses a weighted average, assigned the film a score of 42 out of 100, based on 7 critics, indicating "mixed or average" reviews.

Monica Castillo of RogerEbert.com said, "While the dark family dynamics may bring to mind Winter’s Bone or this summer’s much-discussed miniseries, Sharp Objects," the characters and affair subplot are underdeveloped. Owen Gleiberman of Variety wrote Pettyfer "does a skillful job of establishing an atmosphere of small-town service-economy desolation" and Lewis is "superb", but concluded that the film "is more audacious than it is convincing". Leslie Felperin of The Guardian opined, "The performances are sturdy, even so, and the whole has a sombre determination that makes it likable and rather camp."

Dan Callahan of TheWrap was more positive, praising Pettyfer's direction as "an accomplished debut". Callahan added the film "shows how interested he seems to be in the scarier byways of life, which seemed clear in his performance last year in The Strange Ones, a very disturbing and neglected movie about child abuse that seems now like a companion piece to Back Roads, a film that stares unflinchingly at some of the rougher human experiences."

=== Accolades ===
At the Rhode Island International Film Festival, Back Roads won the First Prize Award for Best Feature.
