= Sue Miller =

American novelist

- Born: November 29, 1943 (age 82); Chicago, Illinois, U.S.
- Education: Radcliffe College
- Occupations: Novelist; short story writer
- Website: www.suemillernovelist.com

Sue Miller (born November 29, 1943) is an American novelist and short story writer who has written a number of best-selling novels. She graduated from Radcliffe College.

== Biography ==
Born in Chicago, Miller was preoccupied with her duties as a single mother, leaving little time to write for many years. As a result, she did not publish her first novel until 1986, after spending almost a decade in various fellowships and teaching positions.

Since then, two of her novels have been made into feature films, and her book While I Was Gone was an Oprah's Book Club pick in 2000. Miller has taught creative writing classes at Smith College, Amherst, Tufts, MIT, and Boston University.

== Selected works ==
=== Novels ===
- The Good Mother: a novel (1986) ISBN 9780060505936, made into a movie in 1988
- Family Pictures: a novel (1990) ISBN 9780575403215
- For Love: a novel (1993) ISBN 9780060929992
- The Distinguished Guest: a novel (1995) ISBN 9780060930004
- While I Was Gone: a novel (1999) ISBN 9780345443281
- The World Below: a novel (2001) ISBN 9780747584582
- Lost in the Forest: a novel (2005) ISBN 9780345469595
- The Senator's Wife: a novel (2008) ISBN 9780307264206
- The Lake Shore Limited: a novel (2010) ISBN 9780307264213
- The Arsonist: a novel (2014) ISBN 9780307594792
- Monogamy: a novel (2020) ISBN 9780062969651

=== Short story collections ===
- Inventing the Abbotts and Other Stories (1987) ISBN 9780060929978, made into a movie in 1997

=== Memoirs ===
- The Story of My Father (2003) ISBN 9780375414794
