= Coal Run (novel) =

2004 novel by Tawni O'Dell

- Author: Tawni O’Dell
- Language: English
- Genre: Novel
- Publisher: Viking Press
- Publication date: 17 June 2004
- Publication place: United States
- Pages: 368 pp (first edition, hardback)
- ISBN: 0-670-89995-X (first edition, hardback)
- OCLC: 53132402
- Dewey Decimal: 813/.54 22
- LC Class: PS3565.D428 C63 2004
- Preceded by: Back Roads (January 2000)
- Followed by: Sister Mine (March 2007)

Coal Run is a 2004 novel by the American writer Tawni O’Dell.

== Plot introduction ==
In the coal-mining country of Western Pennsylvania outside of Pittsburgh, Coal Run is a town ravaged and haunted by a mine explosion that took the lives of 96 men. The story explores the life of local deputy and erstwhile football legend, "The Great Ivan Z.," as he prepares for a former teammate's imminent release from prison.

== Plot summary ==
In a town haunted by a deadly mine explosion that took the lives of almost half the male population thirty years earlier, the reverberations are still being felt in the current generation of survivors, among them the narrator Ivan Zoschenko, the local deputy and fallen football legend, "the Great Ivan Z," whose father died that day. His pro career sidelined by an injury, Ivan now spends his days dispensing his own unique form of occasionally wise, usually comic, almost always dangerous justice and his nights drowning his regrets and guilt in a bottle. His story takes place during a week's time while Ivan is seemingly preparing for an old teammate's imminent release from prison. In doing so, he introduces a rich cast of characters – his fiercely independent single-mom sister, the long-absent Vietnam vet he idolized as a child, the town's no-nonsense pediatrician who brandishes vaccinations on the doorsteps of neglectful parents like a Wild West sheriff, and the old friend and onetime mirror image of himself who now lives the kind of simple life Ivan both admires and pities. During the events of this week, Ivan confronts his demons and reveals himself to be a man whose conscience is burdened by a long-held and shocking secret involving the ruined life of a young girl that must be finally reckoned with.
