= Sheri Reynolds =

American dramatist

Sheri Reynolds (born c. 1967) is an author of contemporary Southern fiction.

She was born and raised in rural South Carolina and lives on Virginia's eastern shore. She graduated from Conway High School in 1985, Davidson College in 1989, and Virginia Commonwealth University in 1992.

She is an associate professor and the Ruth and Perry Morgan Chair of Southern Literature at Old Dominion University in Norfolk, VA. Reynolds teaches creative writing and literature classes. She won the Outstanding Faculty Award from the State Council for Higher Education of Virginia in 2003, and in 2005, she received a grant from the Virginia Commission for the Arts in playwriting. She has also taught at Virginia Commonwealth University, The College of William and Mary, and Davidson College.

Her first play, Orabelle's Wheelbarrow, won the Women Playwrights' Initiative playwriting competition for 2005.

== Selected works ==
- Bitterroot Landing (1994)
- The Rapture of Canaan, an Oprah's Book Club selection and New York Times bestseller (1997)
- A Gracious Plenty (1999)
- The Firefly Cloak (2006)
- The Sweet In-Between (2008)
