= Melinda Haynes =

American novelist

- Born: December 3, 1955 (age 70); Hattiesburg, Mississippi, U.S.
- Occupation: Novelist
- Writing career
- Genre: Southern Gothic
- Notable works: Mother of Pearl, Chalktown (2001), Willem's Field (2003)
- Literary movement: Modernism, stream of consciousness

Melinda Haynes (born December 3, 1955) is an American novelist. She grew up in Hattiesburg, Mississippi. For much of her adult life she was a painter. In 1999, she wrote her first published novel, Mother of Pearl, while living in a mobile home in Grand Bay, Alabama. Melinda Haynes currently resides in Mobile, Alabama with her husband, Ray. Her writing has a close relationship to Mississippi in the 1950s and 1960s.

== Works ==
In June 1999, Haynes' first novel, Mother of Pearl (1999, ISBN 0-7868-6485-0, hardcover) was chosen to be a member of Oprah's Book Club. The novel also was a New York Times' Best Seller.

Her second novel Chalktown (May 2, 2001, ISBN 0-7862-3356-7, hardcover) was published by Hyperion Books in Hardback (317 pp) and Paperback (368 pp).

Haynes's third book is titled, Willem's Field (2003, ISBN 0-7432-3849-4). Willem's Field is a 432-page print hardback and paperback book.
