= Jewel (novel) =

1991 novel by Brett Lott

- Language: English
- Genre: Novel
- Publisher: Pocket Books
- Publication date: November 1991
- Publication place: United States
- Media type: Print (hardback & paperback)
- ISBN: 0-671-74038-5 (first edition, hardback)
- OCLC: 23731561
- Dewey Decimal: 813/.54 20
- LC Class: PS3562.O784 J49 1991

Jewel is a novel by Bret Lott, which was chosen as an Oprah's Book Club selection.

== Plot introduction ==
It is 1943, and life is good for Jewel Hilburn, her husband, Leston, and their five children. Despite the ongoing war, Mississippi's booming economy has kept the hardworking family's business steady. Even the news that eldest son James has enlisted is mitigated by the fact that Jewel, now pushing 40, is pregnant with her sixth and final child. Her joy is slightly clouded, however, when her childhood friend Cathedral arrives at the door with a troubling prophecy: "I say unto you that the baby you be carrying be yo' hardship, be yo' test in this world. This be my prophesying unto you, Miss Jewel."

When the child is finally born, it seems that Cathedral's prediction was empty: the baby appears normal in every way. As the months go by, however, Jewel becomes increasingly afraid that something is wrong with little Brenda Kay—she doesn't cry, she doesn't roll over, she's hardly ever awake. Eventually husband and wife take the baby to the doctor and are informed that she is a "Mongolian Idiot," not expected to live past the age of 2. Jewel angrily rebuffs the doctor's suggestion that they institutionalize Brenda Kay. Instead, the Hilburns shoulder the burdens—and discover the unexpected joys—of living with a Down syndrome child.

== Film, TV or theatrical adaptations ==
- In 2001 made into a TV movie, starring Farrah Fawcett in the title role.
