= Drowning Ruth =

2000 novel by Christina Schwarz

- First edition cover
- Author: Christina Schwarz
- Language: English
- Genre: Novel
- Publisher: Doubleday Publishing
- Publication date: September 2000
- Publication place: United States
- Media type: Print (hardback & paperback)
- Pages: 352 pp (hardback edition)
- ISBN: 0-385-50253-2 (hardback edition)
- OCLC: 43810705

Drowning Ruth is a 2000 bestselling novel by Christina Schwarz, author of five novels (as of 2021). Drowning Ruth was chosen as a selection for Oprah's Book Club in September 2000.

== Plot summary ==
Amanda and Mathilda are two sisters who live in rural Wisconsin. While Mathilda is petite, well-liked, pretty, and adventurous, Amanda is tall, clumsy, awkward, and serious. When Mathilda marries Carl, Amanda feels betrayed and leaves to go to nursing school. Meanwhile, Mathilda and Carl are married and living together on a small island near the family farm. They are happy there, and welcome their child, Ruth, into the world. A short time later, however, Carl begins to feel trapped, enlists in the army and is sent away to France. Mathilda is devastated and angry at his departure and decides to move back to the mainland and into the old house of her late parents.

Amanda begins to feel agitated and upset. She's also frequently ill and has become a nervous wreck. Amanda is persuaded to take a rest from her nursing job, and travels back to the family farm to stay with her sister and niece. The three grow close, and Amanda begins to see Ruth as their child, becoming very protective of her. After living in the farm house for a while, Amanda persuades Mathilda to move back to the island. Hesitant at first, Mathilda soon agrees, and the three of them go to the island.

During the summer, it becomes apparent that Amanda is pregnant and desperate to hide the pregnancy. Mathilda agrees to adopt the child as her own and make up a story about the baby being an orphan from a "hired girl." While Amanda is pleased with this arrangement, she has to hide her pregnancy, so she cannot leave the island until after the baby is born.

Mathilda delivers Amanda's baby girl in the house while Ruth is under the bed. Sometime in the night, Amanda changes her mind about Mathilda raising the baby and tries to leave the island by walking across the ice with the child. Ruth, who is roughly four at the time, follows Amanda out onto the ice. Mathilda runs out after them. Out on the ice, they walk over a thin patch and the ice starts to break. Ruth and Mathilda go under, while Amanda desperately tries to save them. Mathilda pushes Ruth to the surface to save her, but falls back in herself. Amanda tries desperately to pull her out, but can't do it without falling in, so Mathilda bites her sister's finger to force her to let go and leave her to drown in the freezing water. Ruth is half dead and frozen on the ice with the baby, but she is revived.

Amanda takes the baby to a woman in town who has recently had a stillborn child. She tells the woman that a hired girl had the baby and then died during childbirth. She also tells her that the baby's name is Imogene. The woman is so taken with the child, and so amazed at the situation that she doesn't notice that both Ruth and Amanda are frozen and wearing nightgowns. She also doesn't notice the blood on Amanda.

Soon after Mathilda's death, Carl returns home from the war with serious injuries, and is nursed back to health by Amanda. Ruth, traumatized, is behaving oddly and very leery of her father, whom she barely knows. The three of them live together without incident, but after a while, Carl starts to suspect that there might be more to the story of his wife's death than he has been told. As far as he knows, his wife wandered out into the night all alone and disappeared, later to be found under the ice.

Amanda begins to experience severe anxiety again. She is institutionalized in a mental hospital, and Carl is left to take care of Ruth on his own. Worried that he doesn't know enough about children, he asks his cousin Hilda to come to the farm and care for Ruth. Ruth dislikes the strict and humorless Hilda almost instantly. Hilda sees Ruth as a problem child, and seems almost to enjoy punishing her.

Later on, when they are young adults, Ruth and Imogene become friends.

== Development and release ==
It's scary looking back, because I see how it might not have worked out at all. I just hoped I'd have enough money from the book to justify starting another one. It's done more than that.

— Schwarz, in an interview with Entertainment Weekly

Christina Schwarz began working on the characters for Drowning Ruth in 1989, drawing inspiration from what she called a "Boo Radleyish" neighbor from her childhood, who was largely a recluse and was rumored to have shot at children who trespassed onto her property.

Having received her Master's degree from Yale University, Schwarz began teaching at a private high school. Her husband encouraged her to quit teaching and dedicate herself to her novel. Schwarz spent almost five years writing the book while working odd jobs; her husband, Benjamin Schwarz (who eventually became an Atlantic Monthly editor) financially supported them.

In 1999 she sent the first few pages of the novel accompanied by a cover letter to the Virginia Barber Agency. Jennifer Rudolph Walsh, the agent who received it, found the submission "irresistible" and asked that the rest be sent urgently. Schwarz, however, explained that she could not afford to send the entire manuscript to New York by FedEx. Deb Futter, of Doubleday also loved the book, ultimately winning the publishing rights at auction and releasing it as "hard-soft" title with Ballantine Books. At the time, Futter said the exciting thing about the book was its "utter obsessiveness." Random House Audible, a joint effort between Random House and Audible Inc., announced that Drowning Ruth would be its launch title. The foreign rights were also sold to publishers in the U.K., Germany, France, Italy, Japan, the Netherlands, Finland, Sweden, and Denmark. The book reportedly found support among independent booksellers, particularly in Wisconsin, where the story is set. However, the digital-only audiobook release drew complaints from these sellers, as they spoke of being left out of the market.

The book had an initial and second run of 25,000 each, and publicity director Allison Rich announced in October 2000 that an additional 750,000 copies would be sent to press.

== Reception ==
Calling the work a "brilliantly understated psychological thriller," Publishers Weekly said that "Schwarz deftly uses first-person narration to heighten the drama. Her prose is spare but bewitching, and she juggles the speakers and time periods with the surety of a seasoned novelist." Paul Gray with Time called her work an "unusually deft and assured first novel [that] conveys a good deal more than thrills and chills." Reviewing it as a young adult novel, School Library Journal said the book is a "wonderfully constructed gothic suspense novel" and "a compelling complex tale of psychological mystery and maddeningly destructive provincial attitudes. While conceding that "it is not hard to see why Drowning Ruth became a bestseller in the United States," Lisa Allardice writing for the U.K. publication New Statesman called the story "intriguing, if predictable." Commenting on the novel's "lyrical style, its thriller-ish mystery and its sure-handed use of a risky, multiple-narrative gambit," Jerome Weeks with The Dallas Morning News says it "is an impressive achievement for a first novel," but acknowledges that "unfortunately, by the last third of the story ... there are too many coincidences, too many revelations avoided for implausible lengths of time." Similarly, Diane Simon of People said that "if your taste runs to miraculous coincidences and primal emotions, you're in good company with Ruth."

It will drive you crazy with suspense ... I loved it, loved it, loved it; I stayed up all night reading it.

— Oprah Winfrey, on the 37th book club episode

The book made the Amazon best seller list. It also spent four weeks on the New York Times's best seller lists, spending four weeks there and rating number three in for the year. The novel was chosen as a main selection of the Oprah Book Club, Literary Guild, Doubleday Book Club, Teen People, and the Mango Book Club. It was one of the fastest-selling downloads on Audible.com at that time. According to Publishers Weekly, it was the twelfth best-selling work of fiction in the U.S. in 2000. It was the 13th bestselling novel on Apple iBooks for the week ending for the week ended December 31, 2017.

== Film ==
Alix Taylor, the Vice President of Development at Craven/Maddalena's Dimension/Miramax at the time, brought the project to the company's attention. Miramax bought the movie rights with plans for Wes Craven to direct the project, even before the book was released. Taylor subsequently oversaw the project. In October 2000, it was announced that Marianne Maddalena would be the producer and Mark Kruger would write the screenplay.
