= Jewel (2001 film) =

- Genre: Drama
- Based on: Jewel by Bret Lott
- Teleplay by: Susan Cooper
- Directed by: Paul Shapiro
- Starring: Farrah Fawcett; Patrick Bergin
- Music by: Jonathan Goldsmith
- Countries of origin: Canada; United Kingdom; United States
- Original language: English

Production
- Executive producer: Paul A. Kaufman
- Producer: Terry Gould
- Cinematography: Frank Tidy
- Editors: Neil Grieve; Geoffrey Rowland
- Running time: 120 minutes (including commercials)
- Production company: Alliance Atlantis Communications

Original release
- Network: CBS
- Release: February 7, 2001

Jewel is a 2001 television drama film directed by Paul Shapiro, based on the book of the same name by Bret Lott.

== Plot ==
In 1945, Jewel Hilburn, and her husband Leston, are living in poverty in rural Mississippi, and raising their four children: Raylene, Burton, Wilman, and Annie. All four children were nannied by Jewel's friend and housekeeper, Cathedral. Leston makes a living pulling out pine stumps for the war effort. Cathedral's husband, Nelson, and their sons, Sepulchur and Temple, all work for Leston.

The Hilburns discover that Jewel is pregnant, and decide it will be their last child. Cathedral has a premonition and warns Jewel that the child will bring hardship and test her, but that it is God's way of smiling down on Jewel. The Hilburns name the baby girl Brenda Kay. In time it becomes obvious that Brenda is developing much slower than other children. At six months old, she lies very still, when other children her age are able to roll over.

The Hilburns consult their physician, Dr. Beaudry, who calls Dr. Basket, his former teacher and the best pediatrician in the South, to make a diagnosis. He tells Jewel and Leston that Brenda has Down syndrome, and recommends placing her in an institution with other children with the condition, as she would be a huge burden on them and the rest of the family. He predicts that the baby is unlikely to survive past her second birthday.

Outraged, Jewel refuses, insisting she will care for her daughter at home as part of the family. Beaudry tells Jewel that Brenda should receive regular injections to strengthen her bones. The injections are expensive, but the Hilburns manage to pay for them, even when times get tougher after Leston loses his job. The kids sell the vegetables the family grows, Raylene quits school and gets a job, and Jewel takes on sewing work. Meanwhile, Jewel concentrates her attention on caring for Brenda, who survives, but misses developmental milestones. Aged seven, Brenda walks downstairs by herself for the first time. Brenda' constant needs mean Jewel has less time and energy for her older children.

Jewel reads of a "miracle school" in Los Angeles, California, that is reputed to help those in need like Brenda, and proposes that the family moves there to find work while Brenda attends the school. While Leston considers, Burton decides to go to California immediately to look for work. Brenda, meanwhile, has a couple of near brushes with death.

Jewel has secretly applied to the special-ed school, and Brenda has been accepted. To raise money, Jewel secretly starts selling items from her home. Eventually, Leston notices and confronts her. After an argument, he agrees to move to California, on condition that they return to Mississippi someday.

Except Raylene, who gets married and stays in Mississippi, the Hilburns relocate to Los Angeles to reunite with Burton, now working at a garage. Leston finds work, and Brenda is enrolled in the school, run by director Nathan White. For the first time, Brenda meets other people like herself, and Jewel is not solely responsible for her.

In 1961, the school has not raised Brenda's attainment, but Leston has a better job, and Jewel works at the school as a paraprofessional. White suggests to Jewel that she must let go of Brenda, as her efforts are holding her daughter back. Keeping her promise to Leston, they return to Mississippi to search for a new house, but Leston realizes that his home is now in Los Angeles, and Mississippi is his past. They return to California and resume their lives. Gradually, Jewel accepts White's argument that Brenda must be allowed to live her own life. White recommends a group home for adults with developmental disabilities, where Brenda will learn to live independently from Jewel's over-protective care.

The Hilburns leave Brenda at the home with the new friends she has made. Jewel visits her often, but has finally realized the importance of letting her grow by herself.

== Cast ==
- Farrah Fawcett as Jewel Hilburn
- Patrick Bergin as Leston Hilburn
- Cicely Tyson as Cathedral
- Laura Mercer as Brenda Kay (ages 8–9)
- Ashley Wolfe as Brenda Kay (age 16)
- Rachel Skarsten as Raylene (age 14)
- Natalie Radford as Raylene (ages 22–30)
- Alexis Vandermaelen as Annie (age 3–4)
- Charlotte Arnold as Annie (ages 7–11)
- Kristin Booth as Annie (age 19)
- Max Morrow as Wilman (age 10–11)
- Robin Dunne as Wilman (ages 18–26)
- Kylie Fairlie as Burton (age 11)
- Kelly Harms as Burton ages (19–27)
- Dylan Harman as Dennis (age 9)
- Kenny Freeman as Dennis (age 16)
- Nola Augustson as Mrs. Hamby
- Sean Bell as Gower Cross
- Ardon Bess as Nelson
- Jayne Bickman as Rachel
- Geoffrey Bowes as Dr. Beaudry
- Lori Cooke as Sammy
- Peter Donaldson as Nathan White
- Isabella Fink as Elaine Cross
- Dallas Goyo as Matthew Cross
- Lynne Griffin as Nancy Tindle
- Maggie Huculak as Nancy
- Stacia Langdon as Olivia
- Shawn Lawrence as Larry Tindle
- Ron Payne as Dr. Basket
- Toby Proctor as Gene
- Kim Roberts as May
- Gema Zamprogna as Sarah
