= Vinegar Hill (novel) =

1994 novel by A. Manette Ansay

- First edition cover
- Author: A. Manette Ansay
- Cover artist: Jacket design and illustration by Steven Dana
- Language: English
- Genre: Novel
- Publisher: Viking Penguin
- Publication date: September 1994
- Publication place: United States
- Media type: Print (Hardcover, Paperback, & library binding), audio cassette, and audio download
- Pages: 240 pp (first edition, hardcover)
- ISBN: 0-670-85253-8 (first edition, hardcover)
- OCLC: 30398894
- Dewey Decimal: 813/.54 20
- LC Class: PS3551.N645 V56 1994

Vinegar Hill is a 1994 novel by A. Manette Ansay. It was chosen as an Oprah's Book Club selection in November 1999. It was adapted as a television film in 2005, starring Mary-Louise Parker and Tom Skerritt.

== Plot introduction ==
When Ellen Grier and her family come back to Holly's Field, Wisconsin, it is not what they were hoping. Ellen's husband, James, has no job. The family have to move in with James's parents, Fritz and Mary-Margaret. These two dislike each other but dislike Ellen far more so far that she's on the brink of suicide.
