= Breena Clarke =

African-American scholar and writer of fiction

- Born: Washington, D.C., U.S.
- Education: Webster College; Howard University
- Occupations: Scholar; writer
- Parent(s): James Sheridan Clarke; Edna Payne Clarke
- Relatives: Cheryl Clarke (sister)
- Writing career
- Genre: Fiction
- Notable awards: Alex Award (2000)
- Website: www.breenaclarke.com

Breena Clarke is an African-American scholar and writer of fiction, including an award-winning debut novel River, Cross My Heart (1999). She is the younger sister of poet, essayist, and activist Cheryl Clarke, with whom she organizes the Hobart Festival of Women Writers each summer.

== Biography ==
Clarke was born one of four sisters and a brother in Washington, D.C., to World War II veteran James Sheridan Clarke (September 18, 1912 – January 18, 2009) and Edna Payne Clarke. She was educated at Webster College and at Howard University.

Her debut novel, River, Cross My Heart, was an October 1999 Oprah Book Club selection, when the description stated: "This highly accomplished first novel resonates with ideas, impassioned lyricism, and poignant historical detail as it captures an essential part of the African-American experience in our century." The Publishers Weekly reviewer called it "a novel as lyric and alternately beguiling and confounding as its title. ...a haunting story", and the book spent a month on The New York Times bestseller list.

Clarke's second novel, Stand the Storm, was published in 2008, and The Washington Post reviewer Gail Buckley said: "Breena Clarke has written another stirring work of historical fiction that weaves the passionate, dramatic and uplifting story of the African American aspiration for true freedom into the great American tapestry." Clarke's third novel, Angels Make Their Hope Here, published in 2014, also received favorable notices from such reviewers as Alan Cheuse at NPR's All Things Considered.

== Bibliography ==
- River, Cross My Heart, Back Bay Books, 1999, ISBN 0316899984
- Stand the Storm: A Novel, 2008
- Angels Make Their Hope Here, Little, Brown and Company, 2014, ISBN 978-0316254007

== Awards ==
- 1999: New Atlantic Independent Booksellers Association (NAIBA) award for fiction
- 2000: Alex Award from the Young Adult Library Services Association
