= Sister Mine =

2007 novel by Tawni O'Dell

- Author: Tawni O'Dell
- Language: English
- Genre: Novel
- Publisher: Random House
- Publication date: 13 March 2007
- Publication place: United States
- Pages: 416 pp (first edition, hardback)
- ISBN: 0-307-35167-X
- OCLC: 176953586
- Preceded by: Coal Run (June 2004); Back Roads (January 2000)

Sister Mine is a 2007 novel by the American writer Tawni O'Dell.

== Plot introduction ==
In the coal-mining country of Western Pennsylvania outside of Pittsburgh, the fictional locale of Jolly Mount is home to Shae-Lynn Penrose. Two years ago, five of her miner friends were catapulted to media stardom when they were rescued after surviving four days trapped in a mine. As the men struggle to come to terms with their ordeal, along with the fallout of their short-lived celebrity, Shae-Lynn finds herself facing her relationship with her brutal father, her conflicted passion for one of the miners, and the hidden identity of the man who fathered her son.

== Plot summary ==
Shae-Lynn Penrose drives a cab in a town where no one needs a cab—but plenty of people need rides. A former police officer with a closet full of miniskirts, a recklessly sharp tongue, and a tendency to deal with men by either beating them up or taking them to bed, she has spent years carving out a life for herself and her son in Jolly Mount, Pennsylvania, the coal-mining town where she grew up.

When the younger sister Shae-Lyn thought was dead arrives on her doorstep followed closely by a gun-wielding Russian gangster, a shady New York lawyer, and a desperate Connecticut housewife, Shae-Lynn is forced to grapple with the horrible truth she discovers about the life her sister's been living, and one ominous question: will her return result in a monstrous act of greed, or one of sacrifice?
