= Benjamin Schwarz (writer) =

American editor and writer (born 1963)

- Born: October 20, 1963 (age 62)
- Education: Yale University
- Occupations: Editor, author
- Employer(s): The Atlantic (magazine), RAND Corporation

Benjamin Schwarz (born October 20, 1963) is an American editor and writer. He has written articles, essays, monographs, and reviews on an array of subjects, including literature, history, politics, women's fashion, national security, cinema,foreign policy, architecture, theater,and international economics.

== Early life ==
Schwarz was born on October 20, 1963. He holds a B.A. and an M.A. in history from Yale University, where he received the Woodrow Wilson National Fellowship Foundation's Mellon Fellowship in the Humanities. Schwarz was a Fulbright scholar at Magdalen College, Oxford.

== Career ==
Schwarz was the literary and national editor for The Atlantic from 2000 to 2013. In addition to working on feature articles for the magazine, Schwarz ran The Atlantic's cultural and literary department, which under his editorship expanded its coverage to include popular culture and more. The Los Angeles Times wrote that Schwarz had "re-shaped the venerable magazine's book section into the shrewdest, best-written and most surprising cultural report currently on offer between slick covers." For the section he recruited regular contributors such as Perry Anderson, Caitlin Flanagan, Sandra Tsing Loh, Christopher Hitchens, Cristina Nehring, Joseph O'Neill, Terry Castle, Mona Simpson, Clive James, and B. R. Myers. He also wrote a lengthy monthly column for the magazine on books and culture. Articles under his editorial management either won or were finalists for the National Magazine Award for Criticism from 2000 to 2009. The Columbia Journalism Review described Schwarz as "the magazine's in-house intellectual." A national correspondent for The Atlantic from 1995 to 2000, Schwarz wrote a series of essays and articles that argued for a reduced role for the United States in global politics. He also wrote several pieces on historical and literary subjects.

From 1996 to 1998, Schwarz was the executive editor of the World Policy Journal, where he bolstered the coverage of cultural issues, international economics, and military affairs. For several years he was a foreign policy analyst at the RAND Corporation, where he researched and wrote on American global strategy, counterinsurgency, counterterrorism, and military doctrine. At RAND, Schwarz wrote a widely cited and highly critical assessment of American counterinsurgency doctrine and practice. Schwarz was also a staff member of the Brookings Institution. In 1999 Schwarz won the Nona Balakian Citation for Excellence in Reviewing from the National Book Critics Circle.

Schwarz was a consulting editor-at-large at Yale University Press. From 2014 to 2017, he was the national editor of The American Conservative, where he commissioned articles by leftist writers and wrote a series of articles on the postwar social changes in Great Britain and on the gentrification in contemporary American cities. He is currently working on a biography of Winston Churchill, which will be published by HarperCollins.

== Personal life ==
His wife, Christina, is the author of the bestselling novel, Drowning Ruth.
