= Cane River (novel) =

2001 novel by Lalita Tademy

- First edition book cover
- Author: Lalita Tademy
- Language: English
- Series: Oprah's book club series
- Subject: Cane River
- Genre: Histortical fiction, family saga
- Publisher: Warner Books
- Publication date: 2001
- Publication place: United States
- Media type: Hardback
- Pages: 418
- ISBN: 9780446527323
- OCLC: 44683424

Cane River is a 2001 family saga historical fiction novel by American writer Lalita Tademy. It is Tademy’s debut novel and was written after her resignation from Sun Microsystems. It was first published in the United States by Warner Books on 2001. Cane River was chosen as an Oprah's Book Club selection.

It tells a story of Tademy’s great-great-great-great grandmother, Elizabeth, a slave of the Creole family. The novel chronicles four generations of African American black women as they battle injustice to unite their family and forge success on their own terms. They are women whose lives begin in slavery, who weather the Civil War, and who grapple with contradictions of emancipation, Jim Crow, and the pre-Civil Rights South. The culture she explores, that of slaves who remained in bondage until after the American Civil War, bears some core similarities but radical dissimilarities to that of Cane River's Melrose-St. Augustine society, whose families had lived as free from the late Spanish period of Louisiana history.
