= While I Was Gone =

1999 novel by Sue Miller

- Author: Sue Miller
- Language: English
- Genre: Novel
- Publisher: Alfred A. Knopf
- Publication date: 1999
- Publication place: United States
- Media type: Print (Hardback & Paperback)
- Pages: 288 pp (first edition hardcover)
- ISBN: 0-375-40112-1 (first edition hardcover) & ISBN 0-345-44328-4 (paperback edition)
- OCLC: 39539051
- Dewey Decimal: 813/.54 21
- LC Class: PS3563.I421444 W47 1999

While I Was Gone is a 1999 novel by Sue Miller. It was chosen as an Oprah's Book Club selection in May 2000.

== Background ==
Miller conceived of While I Was Gone while in the middle of writing a memoir of her father's battle with Alzheimer's disease. Struggling with this story, she decided to return to writing fiction, deciding upon a story about a woman torn between her past and present lives. Miller was also influenced by the murder trial of O. J. Simpson and the investigation of a 15-year-old boy in Boston, charged with allegedly killing one of his friends' mothers. She told the Telegram & Gazette: "I began to wonder how one could have done such a thing and still feel 'innocent.'"

CBS adapted the novel into a TV movie in 2004, starring Kirstie Alley as Jo, Bill Smitrovich as Daniel, and Peter Horton as Eli.

== Plot ==
The novel is narrated by Jo Becker, a veterinarian. Becker lives in Adams Mills, a fictional small town in Massachusetts, with her husband Daniel, a minister. The two have three adult daughters including Sadie, a college student, and Cass, a touring rock singer. Several decades ago, in 1968, a young Jo had fled her upcoming marriage, assumed the false name of Felicia Stead, and moved into a group house in Cambridge living among bohemians. She spent a year there, but her idyllic getaway ended when she came home to find her best friend at the house, Dana Jablonski, murdered. The killer, believed to be a burglar, was never identified. Amid slander and insinuations in the local newspapers, the housemates drifted apart.

Jo's youngest daughter, Sadie, tells her that one of her favorite professors has moved to town. The professor brings a sick dog into Jo's clinic and mentions her husband Eli Mayhew, a scientist. Jo realizes that Eli was one of her old housemates. Jo is attracted to Eli, once nerdy but now well-built and confident, and the two begin spending time together in a relationship bordering on an affair. However, Jo has unresolved questions about Eli's potential role in Dana's death. Eli ultimately confesses to the murder, claiming that his research career has redeemed his past, and Jo must decide whether to turn him in to the police.

The epigraph to the novel is a poem by Miller's mother, Judith Beach Nichols.

== Critical reception ==
The novel was praised in The New York Times, which wrote: "The story is at once so well made and vividly imagined that one might call it an exercise in spontaneous craftsmanship." The Los Angeles Times also praised the review, calling Miller "so good at rendering the everyday world into which crisis breaks." Publishers Weekly, while overall positive, was more measured, calling some of the plot points "convoluted."
