= Mother of Pearl (novel) =

1999 novel by Melinda Haynes

- First edition cover
- Author: Melinda Haynes
- Language: English
- Genre: Novel
- Publisher: Hyperion Books
- Publication date: June 1999
- Publication place: United States
- Media type: Print (hardback & paperback)
- Pages: 448 pp (hardback edition)
- ISBN: 0-7868-6627-6 (hardback edition), ISBN 0-671-77467-0 (paperback edition, Washington Square Press)
- OCLC: 369530069

Mother of Pearl (1999) is a Southern Gothic novel by Melinda Haynes, and was chosen as an Oprah's Book Club selection, June 1999. The audio version is performed by Nana Visitor.

== Plot introduction ==
Set in Petal, Mississippi, a small town at the close of the 1950s, this novel tells the story of the 28-year-old Even Grade, a black man who grew up an orphan, and Valuable Korner, a 15-year-old white girl, who is the daughter of the town prostitute and an unknown father. They are both separately seeking the family, love, and affection they had not had before, until their paths cross owing to their common acquaintance of loner mystic Joody Two Sun.

== Characters in Mother of Pearl ==
- Even Grade – 28-year-old black man
- Valuable Korner – 14-year-old white girl, daughter of Enid Korner and unknown father
- Bea – white woman, partner of Neva
- Canaan Mosley – black man, janitor at library who is writing ‘The Reality of the Negro,’ older friend and neighbor of Even Grade
- Enid Korner – Valuable's mother
- Luvenia Korner – Valuable's grandmother, Enid's mother
- Grace Johnson – black woman, caretaker of Joleb
- Jackson McLain – white boy, friend of Valuable and father of Pearl
- Joleb Green – white boy, friend of Valuable
- Burris Green - brother of Joleb who believes that he can see the face of God on upcoming trains
- Joody Two Sun – black-Indian woman, partner of Even Grade
- Louise Green – aunt of Joleb
- Beryn Green - racist father of Joleb
- Neva – white woman, wealthy lesbian aunt of Jackson, partner of Bea
- Pearl – son of Valuable and Jackson
- Russ (Father Russell L. Landry) – Catholic priest
