= Kaye Gibbons =

American novelist

- Born: May 5, 1960 (age 66); Nash County, North Carolina, U.S.
- Education: Rocky Mount Senior High School; North Carolina State University; University of North Carolina at Chapel Hill
- Occupation: Novelist
- Children: 3
- Writing career
- Genre: Southern literature
- Subject: Women
- Notable work: Ellen Foster

Kaye Gibbons (born May 5, 1960) is an American novelist. Her first novel, Ellen Foster (1987), received the Sue Kaufman Prize for First Fiction from the American Academy and Institute of Arts and Letters, a Special Citation from the Ernest Hemingway Foundation and the Louis D. Rubin, Jr. Prize in Creative Writing from the University of North Carolina at Chapel Hill. Gibbons is a member of the Fellowship of Southern Writers and two of her books, Ellen Foster and A Virtuous Woman, were selected for Oprah's Book Club in 1998.

Gibbons was born in Nash County, North Carolina, and went to Rocky Mount Senior High School. She attended North Carolina State University and the University of North Carolina at Chapel Hill, studying American and English literature. She has three daughters.

Gibbons has bipolar disorder and notes that she is extremely creative during her manic phases, in which she believes that everything is instrumented by a "real magic". Ellen Foster was written during one such phase.

On November 2, 2008, Gibbons was arrested on prescription drug fraud charges. According to authorities, she was taken into custody while trying to pick up a fraudulent prescription for the painkiller hydrocodone. She was sentenced to a 90-day suspended sentence, 2 years probation, and a $300 fine.

== Works ==
- Ellen Foster (1987)
- A Virtuous Woman (1989)
- A Cure for Dreams (1991)
- Charms for the Easy Life (1993)
- Sights Unseen (1995)
- On the Occasion of My Last Afternoon (1998)
- Divining Women (2004)
- The Life All Around Me (2005)
