= Kyle Prater =

American football player (born 1992)

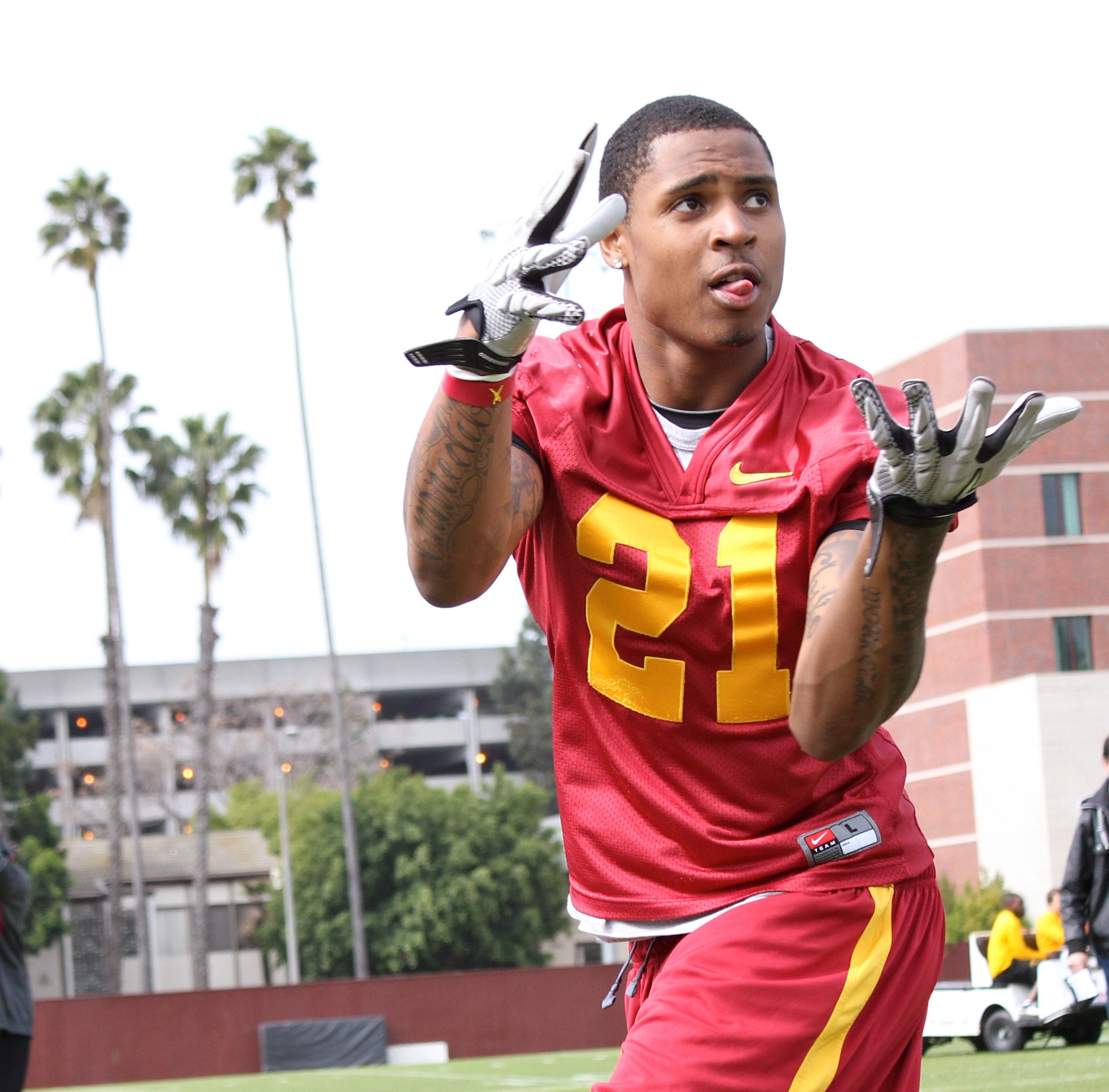
- Prater with the USC Trojans in 2011

No. 21
- Position: Wide receiver

Personal information
- Born: June 21, 1992 (age 34); Maywood, Illinois, U.S.
- Listed height: 6 ft 5 in (1.96 m)
- Listed weight: 231 lb (105 kg)

Career information
- High school: Hillside (IL) Proviso West
- College: Northwestern
- NFL draft: 2015: undrafted

Career history
- New Orleans Saints (2015–2016)*
- * Offseason or practice squad member only
- Stats at Pro Football Reference

Kyle Prater (born June 21, 1992) is an American former professional football wide receiver. Prater attended Proviso West High School in Hillside, Illinois where he was a member of the football and basketball teams. Prater was a five-star football recruit and ranked as the No. 1 wide receiver in the 2010 recruiting class by Rivals.com. Prater committed to play for the University of Southern California in September 2009. After two seasons at USC, he transferred to Northwestern University. After going undrafted in the 2015 NFL draft, he was signed as an undrafted free agent by the New Orleans Saints.

== Early life ==
Prater graduated early from Proviso West High School. Rivals.com rated Prater as the #3 overall prospect in the class of 2010 and Scout.com rated him as the #4 overall prospect. In his junior season he had 60 catches for 948 yards and 9 touchdowns and in his senior year he had 64 receptions for 1151 yards and 13 touchdowns, virtually single-handedly leading the Proviso West Panthers to their first ever post-season appearance and first ever IHSA playoff win. He played in the 2010 U.S. Army All-American Bowl in San Antonio, Texas for his final high school game where he had 3 receptions for 32 yards.

== College career ==
In September 2009, Prater committed to USC. He graduated early from high school and intended to be an early enrollee at USC for the spring term, but decided to wait on enrolling after he found out that Pete Carroll was going to become the Seattle Seahawks new head coach. Prater decided to go through with his plans to enroll early at USC when Lane Kiffin was named USC's new head coach. He red shirted his freshman year due to injury. On January 9, 2012 Prater announced that he planned to transfer from USC to an undetermined school. He stated that he wanted to be closer to home and his release specified that he could not transfer to any other Pac-12 schools or Notre Dame, thus making a school in the Big Ten his likely destination. Prater decided that he will be transferring to Northwestern.

== Professional career ==
Prater was signed by the New Orleans Saints as an undrafted free agent in the 2015 offseason. On August 17, 2015, he was released by the Saints. On August 18, 2016, he was reclaimed and placed on injured reserve by the Saints.
