= Back Roads (novel) =

1999 novel by Tawni O'Dell

- Author: Tawni O'Dell
- Language: English
- Genre: Novel
- Publisher: Viking Press/Allen Lane
- Publication date: December 1999
- Publication place: United States
- Media type: Print (hardback & paperback)
- Pages: 338 pp (hardback edition)
- ISBN: 0-670-88760-9 (hardback edition) & ISBN 0-451-20234-1 (paperback edition)
- OCLC: 40891038
- Dewey Decimal: 813/.54 21
- LC Class: PS3565.D428 B33 2000
- Preceded by: None, Back Roads was Tawni's first published novel.
- Followed by: Coal Run (June 2004), Sister Mine (March 2007)

Back Roads is the 1999 novel by the American writer Tawni O'Dell, and was chosen as an Oprah's Book Club selection in March 2000.

Describing her novel and characters during an interview in 2000, O'Dell said:

"I didn't see it as a novel of redemption.... To me, Harley was the hero of this book. He was doing the best he could with what he had.... There'd definitely not be that riding off into the sunset kind of hope."

== Plot introduction ==
Harley Altmyer, a nineteen-year-old, becomes the caregiver for his three sisters when his mother is jailed for killing his abusive father. Living in the coal town of Laurel Falls in backwoods Western Pennsylvania and increasingly embittered by the sudden changes in his life, he becomes obsessed with a mother of two who lives down the lane.

== Plot summary ==
While still just a teenager, Harley Altmyer suddenly becomes the head of his family's household when his mother is convicted of killing his abusive father and sent to prison, changing his future from a vision of college life that included drinking beer and chasing girls to one in which he feels trapped in a small, dead-end, coal town-life as a nineteen-year-old forced to work two minimum-wage jobs in order to care for his three younger sisters.

After a chance encounter with a beautiful but depressed mother of two who lives nearby, he becomes obsessed with her even as he explores the dynamics of his dysfunctional family with the help of a court-appointed therapist and begins a journey of self-realization and healing.

== Film adaptation ==
In 2011, it was announced that a film adaptation of the book would be directed by Adrian Lyne; however, the film never made it into production.

In late 2015, it was announced that Alex Pettyfer and his producing partner Craig Robinson, who set up Upturn Productions in 2015 with the intent of securing literary works that could be made into film or television, secured the rights for a film adaptation of the book. The film, Back Roads went into production in March 2017, with Pettyfer also serving as its director. The film stars Pettyfer as Harley Altmyer, Jennifer Morrison as Callie Mercer, Juliette Lewis as Bonnie Altmyer, Nicola Peltz as Amber Altmyer, and Robert Patrick as Chief Mansour.
