= Ellen Foster =

1987 novel by Kaye Gibbons

- cover of 1987 hardcover version of Ellen Foster
- Author: Kaye Gibbons
- Language: English
- Genre: Novel; Drama
- Publisher: Vintage Press
- Publication date: 1987
- Publication place: United States
- Media type: Print (hardcover)
- ISBN: 1-56512-205-4
- OCLC: 14167235

Ellen Foster is a 1987 novel by American novelist Kaye Gibbons. It was a selection of Oprah's Book Club in October 1997.

== Background ==
Gibbons wrote Ellen Foster at age 26 while studying American literature at the University of North Carolina at Chapel Hill. Reportedly, at age 25 she approached professor Louis Rubin, who had just started the publishing company Algonquin Books, and presented him with the first 30 pages of the novel. After fellow student Lee Smith introduced Gibbons to her agent, Liz Darhansoff, Darhansoff agreed to represent her, and Algonquin would publish the book.

Gibbons has said she wrote Ellen Foster quickly, in about six weeks. Though the book is fictional, and Gibbons initially denied that it was autobiographical, she has since been more open in the press about its autobiographical elements. In 2015, she said of the story: "My emotional goal with [Ellen Foster] was to heal my mother's suicide."

Ellen Foster received the Sue Kaufman Award for First Fiction from the Academy of Arts and Letters, and the Louis Rubin Writing Award from the University of North Carolina.

== Plot introduction ==
The novel follows the story of Ellen, the first person narrator, a young white American girl living under unfavorable conditions somewhere in the rural South.

The novel is not written in standard English. It is often grammatically incorrect (a egg sandwich, growed, etc.) and generally tries to render the language of a 9- through 11-year-old girl who, in spite of being clever and ambitious, is relatively uneducated.

The novel is most likely set in the late 1970s, due to the fact that Ellen states the following on page 48 when talking about her teacher-"She lived in the sixties. She used to be a flower child but now she is low key so she can hold a job."

Two time levels are intertwined throughout the book: one presenting Ellen's life from her present point of view, living with her "new mama"; and the other one telling Ellen's story from her mother's death and leading up to the present. The two time levels are united at the end of the novel, when Ellen is about twelve years old.

== Synopsis ==
Ellen is an only child living in a highly dysfunctional and abusive household. Her father is "trash" and has a drinking problem, and the household atmosphere is one of domestic violence. Her mother has a heart condition caused by rheumatic fever and, when the novel opens, is in the hospital. Because of the abuse, from an early age Ellen has contemplated killing her father. After being released from hospital, Ellen's father treats her mother as badly as before, and it is up to Ellen to protect her mother from him. Soon, however, she takes an overdose of pills and dies while Ellen is lying next to her.

After her mother's premature death, Ellen, who is only eleven years of age, takes charge of the meager household finances, and she starts accumulating savings to improve her prospects. In spite of her unhappy childhood, Ellen is a smart girl; she borrows books from the library and is rather creative when it comes to spending her spare time. Her best friend, Starletta, is a young black girl who has poor but kind parents. Ellen is attracted to them even though she has been brought up hating African Americans and cannot overcome her own racist beliefs. Meanwhile, her father has African American friends with whom he drinks.

Ellen's odyssey (almost in a picaresque vein) starts the night Ellen's father mistakes her for her mother. After the first instance of abuse, though not sexual, Ellen leaves and spends the night at Starletta's house. The following morning, having decided to leave her father for good, she packs her belongings and goes to her Aunt Betsy's, who has no children and whose husband has recently died. Betsy treats Ellen well, but when the weekend is over, Betsy turns her out again, and Ellen has to return to her father.

When he starts beating her, her bruises are noticed at school and, as a temporary solution, her free spirited art teacher, Julia, invites Ellen to live with her and her husband, Roy. Ellen accepts, leaving with her few belongings and the money she has saved. Despite not completely understanding Julia and Roy's way of life, Ellen feels loved and happy. During the period of separations, her father tries to get her back by bribing her with money, but fails.

Eventually the question of custody is settled in court, and Ellen learns that her maternal grandmother is going to take care of her. A wealthy woman who can even afford two household aides, her grandmother turns out to be a grumpy and bitter old woman who does not really love her granddaughter. She reproaches Ellen for being her father's daughter and for taking after him, claims Ellen is responsible for her own daughter's death, and falsely accuses Ellen of having sex with her father's colored friends. When she becomes ill, she expects Ellen to nurse her, which Ellen dutifully does up to the time of her grandmother's death.

Ellen's life does not improve when she is taken up by one of her mother's sisters, her aunt Nadine Nelson, who lives with her daughter Dora. Dora, who is the same age as Ellen, and Nadine are a self-sufficient pair who consider Ellen an intruder. A quarrel occurs on Christmas Day, when Dora gets many presents and Ellen receives a single pack of white drawing paper, which she throws at Nadine's feet.

In church, Ellen encounters a friendly woman, whom she believes is called Mrs. Foster, and her well-behaved children. After an argument with Nadine, she packs her things and goes to the house of the "Foster family". In reality, the "family" is a home for disadvantaged adolescents—a foster family. Orphaned by her father's death, for the first time she is given a warm welcome. Ellen overcomes her racial prejudice and is happy when her new mama allows Starletta to spend the weekend with her at her new home.

== Characters ==
- Ellen Foster is the 10-year-old protagonist of the novel. She suffers physical abuse, sexual abuse and psychological abuse from her alcoholic father and after her mother commits suicide, is tossed around from one household to another. Throughout her journey, Ellen is hopeful that she will someday find a nice and loving home, which she eventually does.
- Daddy is the novel's antagonist. He abuses his daughter, Ellen, physically, sexually and psychologically. He has alcoholism and holds no job other than selling liquor, eventually drinking himself to death.
- Mama, Ellen's mother, has suffered from poor health, suffering from "romantic [rheumatic] fever" since childhood. When she is at last at the hospital, she is so severely depressed as a result of her husband's cruelty and her illness that she commits suicide by overdosing on prescription medication.
- Starletta is Ellen's black best friend, who helps Ellen to realize that skin color makes no difference in the quality of the person. She lives with her mother and father in a ramshackle cabin with no indoor toilet and they often provide Ellen with refuge from her father. Gradually, Starletta transforms from an unsophisticated child into a mature young woman, and she develops a crush on a white boy from school.
- New Mama, Ellen's foster mother, is everything for which Ellen could have hoped. New Mama is kind, caring, nurturing, always has enough money to pay for groceries, and has plenty of love to give Ellen and the other children she fosters.
- Mama's Mama, Ellen's grandmother on her maternal side, is old and miserly and treats Ellen with cruelty, as she despises Ellen's father for daughter in-law by divorced and seeks vengeance on him through Ellen. After winning custody of Ellen in court, she immediately sends her to work the fields with the black field hands on the farms she owns in the scorching summer heat. At the end of the summer, she dies of illness, even after Ellen has taken extraordinary good care of her.
- Mavis, a kind field worker on Ellen's grandmother's farm, takes Ellen under her wing and teaches her how to row the land and how to stay cool in the unbearable summer heat. She tells Ellen of how she had known her mother as a child and says that Ellen looks very much like her. Mavis has a large, happy family that Ellen admires and wants to emulate.
- Nadine, Ellen's aunt on her maternal side, is false and pretentious and lies to herself that she is wealthy and successful to gain confidence. She is forced to take Ellen for a short period of time, though she eventually kicks her out of the house on Christmas Day. She dotes on her daughter Dora and treats Dora like a small child, although she is the same age as Ellen.
- Dora, Ellen's cousin and daughter of Nadine, is a sheltered, spoiled brat who gets everything she wants when she wants it. She is a chronic pants-wetter, though she is the same age as Ellen.
- Julia, Ellen's grade school art teacher who takes her temporarily after another teacher learns that she is being abused at home. Julia is a hippie raised in the Northeast, who has migrated to the South after college with her husband, Roy. She is very liberal and encourages Ellen in her artistic endeavors.
- Roy, Julia's husband, is a progressively minded hippie who keeps an organic garden that he fertilizes with chicken manure, with which Ellen is fascinated. He bakes Ellen a lovely cake for her birthday and does not mind taking care of other household chores typically performed by a woman.
- Rudolph & Ellis are Ellen's uncles on her paternal side, who agree to spy on Ellen and her father for Ellen's grandmother. They make inaccurate reports that Ellen is wild and a troublemaker and are compensated by Ellen's grandmother with large sums of money, some of which she instructs them to give to Ellen and her father for the bare necessities.
- 'Stella, Ellen's foster sister at her new mama's house, is a big flirt and sits at the back of the bus with the boys on the way to school. As a seventh grader, she is a mother to a fatherless baby, Roger, and is the youngest mother Ellen has ever known.
- Roger is Stella's baby son who likes to crawl into Ellen's room and chew on objects he finds on the floor.
- Betsy is Ellen's aunt on her maternal side who allows Ellen to stay with her for a weekend and finds it funny when Ellen had misunderstood that she would be staying permanently. She is petty and bickers with Nadine, her sister, when their mother dies.
- Dolphin is the horse Ellen rides and cares for at her new mama's house.
- Jo Jo is Ellen's new foster sister who loves to dance to music with no words.

== Critical reception ==
The New York Times praised Gibbons' debut, particularly its "lively humor" and Ellen's strength as a heroine. Kirkus Reviews also praised the book: "A child's-eye tale of evil giving way to goodness -- and happily far more spunky than sweet."

== Edition ==
- Virago Modern Classics No.450 (London, 1998), 126pp. (ISBN 1-86049-605-9).

== Sequel ==
Gibbons wrote a sequel to Ellen Foster, The Life All Around Me by Ellen Foster, in 2006. It picks up Ellen's life story from where Ellen Foster left off. She now lives in the Sand Hills Piedmont region of North Carolina; Ava Gardner's birthplace (near Smithfield, North Carolina) is down the road from her house. The story follows Ellen's teenage years living with her foster mother and applying to Harvard University at age 15.

== Television film ==
On December 14, 1997, a made-for-television film based on the book was aired on CBS as a Hallmark Hall of Fame movie, and is now on DVD. The movie was directed by John Erman, screenplay by Maria Nation and William Hanley. The movie is rated PG-13 for some abusive treatment of a child, and is 120 minutes including commercials. Production took place in Vancouver, British Columbia, Canada.

Cast:

- Julie Harris - Lenora Nelson
- Jena Malone - Ellen Foster
- Ted Levine - Bill Hammond
- Glynnis O'Connor - Charlotte Nelson Hammond
- Debra Monk - Aunt Nadine
- Kimberly J. Brown - Dora
- Barbara Garrick - Aunt Betsy
- Kate Burton - Abigail
- Željko Ivanek - Chief Inspector
- Lynne Moody - Mrs. Douglas
- Bill Nunn - Mr. Douglas
- Allison Jones - Starletta Douglas
- Amanda Peet - Julia Hobbs
- Timothy Olyphant - Roy Hobbs
