= The Rapture of Canaan =

1995 novel by Sheri Reynolds

- Recent paperback cover
- Author: Sheri Reynolds
- Language: English
- Genre: Novel
- Publisher: Diane Pub
- Publication date: June 1995
- Publication place: United States
- Media type: Print (hardback & paperback)
- ISBN: 0-7881-6169-5 (paperback first edition)

The Rapture of Canaan is a 1995 novel by Sheri Reynolds. The book was chosen as an Oprah's Book Club selection in 1997, and the paperback edition subsequently made the Publishers Weekly and New York Times bestseller lists.

== Plot ==
Adolescent Ninah lives in a strict fundamentalist Christian community (The Church of Fire and Brimstone and God's Almighty Baptizing Wind) led by her grandfather Herman. The community is governed by a series of strict rules covering everything from drinking to speaking to people outside of the community, with punishments ranging from sleeping on stinging nettles to spending a night in a grave.

Despite the rules, Ninah cannot stop herself from falling in love with James, a boy a year older who is also her nephew by marriage. The community allows Ninah and James to become "prayer partners" in order that they can spend time with one another in the hopes of a future marriage. James and Ninah pray for Jesus to speak through them in order to help them defeat their attraction for one another, but eventually, their physical attraction is too strong, and Ninah becomes pregnant. James, fearing punishment from the community, commits suicide. Ninah insists that Jesus, rather than James, is the father of the baby.

During her pregnancy, Ninah mulls over her feelings toward God and decides that her experience of God's love is closer to her feelings toward James than to the attitude of her church. However, when the baby is born with its palms attached in an attitude of prayer, the entire community is convinced that baby Canaan is the new Messiah.

== Characters ==
- Ninah is a passionate, thoughtful young woman who strives to be a good daughter and a good Christian, but questions the rules of her strict religious society.
- Grandpa Herman is the pastor of "The Church of Fire and Brimstone and God's Almighty Baptizing Wind". He makes up all the community's rules and strictly enforces their punishments.
- James is Ninah's lover. He and Ninah grew up together.
- Nanna is Ninah's grandmother, who arranges for Ninah and James to spend time together as "prayer partners".
- Ajita is Ninah's schoolmate, whose family members are adherents of Hinduism.
- Canaan is Ninah's infant son. When he is born, he comes out with his hands sealed together. Everyone thinks he is the new Messiah and that the rapture will come in his lifetime.

== Reception ==
Upon its release the book received mixed reviews. Writing for The New York Times, Zofia Smardz praised Reynolds for writing "a truly rapturous love story" with "two unforgettable characters" but also criticized her for leaving "a curious blank at the heart of her novel by sidestepping the motivations of the church's zealous patriarch". In the Los Angeles Times, novelist Sandra Scofield observed that Reynolds "has accomplished something unique" but also found her characterization of Ninah unsatisfactory, noting that "Ninah's waffling stretches credibility, as if Reynolds didn't quite decide what Ninah ought to believe". M. J. McAteer of The Washington Post observed that the author "often has too heavy a hand" and concluded that "Reynolds would do better to let readers pick up the threads themselves".

In 1997 Oprah Winfrey selected The Rapture of Canaan for Oprah's Book Club, with Reynolds appearing in a 15-minute television segment discussing the book. The book became both a Publishers Weekly and New York Times bestseller. Out of Canaan, an unrelated book by Jan Karon, also made the bestseller list, raising questions about whether consumers erroneously bought Karon's book because of its similar title.
