= River, Cross My Heart =

1999 novel by Breena Clarke

- Author: Breena Clarke
- Language: English
- Genre: Novel
- Publisher: Little, Brown
- Publication date: 1999
- Publication place: United States
- Media type: Print (hardback & paperback)
- Pages: 251 pp
- ISBN: 0-316-14423-1
- OCLC: 40683410
- Dewey Decimal: 813/.54 21
- LC Class: PS3553.L298 R58 1999

River, Cross My Heart is a debut novel by Breena Clarke. It was chosen in October 1999 as an Oprah Book Club selection: "This highly accomplished first novel resonates with ideas, impassioned lyricism, and poignant historical detail as it captures an essential part of the African-American experience in our century."

== Plot introduction ==
After the Potomac River claims the death by drowning of eight-year-old Clara Bynum, her family leave the rural world of North Carolina in search of a better life among friends and relatives in Georgetown, Washington, DC. They seek to come to terms with their loss.
