= A. Manette Ansay =

American author

- Born: 1964 (age 61–62); Lapeer, Michigan, U.S.
- Education: Cornell University (MFA)
- Spouse: Jake Smith (m. 1990; divorced)
- Children: 1
- Writing career
- Notable work: Vinegar Hill

A. Manette Ansay (born 1964) is an American author.

== Career ==
Ansay was born in Lapeer, Michigan. When she was five, her family moved to Port Washington, Wisconsin, where she graduated from Port Washington High School in 1982.

She attended Cornell University, graduating with an MFA in 1991.

Her 1994 novel Vinegar Hill was chosen as an Oprah's Book Club selection in November 1999. It was adapted as a television film in 2005, starring Mary-Louise Parker and Tom Skerritt.

== Works ==
=== Fiction ===
- Vinegar Hill. Gene Berry and Jeffrey Campbell Collection (Library of Congress). New York: Viking. 1994. ISBN 978-0-670-85253-6.
- Read This and Tell Me What It Says. Amherst: University of Massachusetts Press. 1995. ISBN 978-0-87023-988-5.
- Sister. New York: William Morrow. 1996. ISBN 978-0-688-14449-4.
- River Angel. New York: William Morrow. 1998. ISBN 978-0-688-15243-7.
- Midnight Champagne. New York: Perennial. 1999. ISBN 978-0-380-729753.
- Blue Water. New York: William Morrow. 2006. ISBN 978-0-688-17287-9.
- Good Things I Wish You. New York: Harper. 2009. ISBN 978-0-06-123996-0.

=== Nonfiction ===
- Limbo: A Memoir. New York: William Morrow. 2001. ISBN 978-0-688-17286-2.

== Recognitions ==
- Vinegar Hill was chosen as an Oprah's Book Club selection November 1999.
- Midnight Champagne was a finalist for the National Book Critics Circle Award.
- Former resident of the Ragdale Foundation
