= A Virtuous Woman =

1989 novel by Kaye Gibbons

- Recent paperback edition cover
- Author: Kaye Gibbons
- Language: English
- Genre: Novel
- Publisher: Workman Publishing
- Publication date: April 1989
- Publication place: United States
- Media type: Print (hardback & paperback)
- Pages: 158 pp (hardback edition) & 165 p. (paperback edition)
- ISBN: 0-945575-09-2 (hardback edition) & ISBN 0-375-70306-3 (paperback edition)
- OCLC: 18223949
- Dewey Decimal: 813/.54 19
- LC Class: PS3557.I13917 V57 1989

A Virtuous Woman is a novel by Kaye Gibbons. It tells of refined woman, Ruby Pitt, meeting and eventually marrying a tenant farmer, Jack Stokes.

It was chosen as an Oprah's Book Club selection in October 1997.
