= Ray McElroy =

American football player (born 1972)

No. 40, 47
- Position: Cornerback

Personal information
- Born: July 31, 1972 (age 54); Bellwood, Illinois, U.S.
- Listed height: 5 ft 11 in (1.80 m)
- Listed weight: 196 lb (89 kg)

Career information
- High school: Hillside (IL) Proviso West
- College: Eastern Illinois
- NFL draft: 1995: 4th round, 114th overall pick

Career history
- Indianapolis Colts (1995–1998); Chicago Bears (2000); Detroit Lions (2001)

Career NFL statistics
- Games played - started: 81 - 9
- Tackles: 65
- Touchdowns: 1
- Stats at Pro Football Reference

Raymond Edward McElroy (born July 31, 1972) is an American former professional football player who was a cornerback for six seasons with the Indianapolis Colts, Chicago Bears, and Detroit Lions of the National Football League (NFL). He played college football for the Eastern Illinois Panthers and was selected in the fourth round of the 1995 NFL draft with the 114th overall pick. He attended Proviso West High School from 1987 to 1990.

McElroy appeared on the MTV show "Made" as a personal football coach for a choirboy hoping to improve his relationship with his football-obsessed father. "Original Air Date: 01-26-11"

Pre-draft measurables
Height	Weight	Arm length	Hand span	40-yard dash	10-yard split	20-yard split	20-yard shuttle	Vertical jump	Broad jump	Bench press
5 ft 11 3/4 in (1.82 m)	196 lb (89 kg)	32 in (0.81 m)	8 7/8 in (0.23 m)	4.64 s	1.66 s	2.73 s	4.23 s	33.5 in (0.85 m)	9 ft 10 in (3.00 m)	16 reps
All values from NFL Combine
