= A Theory of Relativity =

2001 novel by Jacquelyn Mitchard

- Cover art to the first edition
- Author: Jacquelyn Mitchard
- Language: English
- Published: HarperCollins, 2001
- Publication place: United States
- Media type: Book
- Pages: 351
- ISBN: 9780066210230
- OCLC: 45618221

A Theory of Relativity (ISBN 0-06-103199-2) is a 2001 novel written by American author Jacquelyn Mitchard. The book tells the story of a custody battle for a young girl following the sudden death of her parents.

== Plot summary ==
When Ray and Georgia McKenna-Nye are killed in a horrific car crash, leaving their daughter Keefer Kathryn an orphan, the couple's respective families both believe they are the right people to raise the girl, and consequently file for custody. This book is essentially about the events surrounding the ensuing legal process which will decide Keefer's future.

Keefer's maternal family are the McKennas, a Catholic family of Irish descent, and of modest means, living in rural Wisconsin. Prior to their deaths, Ray and Georgia had lived nearby and the family are fairly close. The paternal family, meanwhile, are the Nyes, born again Christians living in Florida who, though much more financially better off than the McKennas, do not appear to be as close.

The final chapter of the book catches up with Keefer as a ten-year-old, and she narrates the events of the intervening years. She is adopted by Gordon after Delia dies. Delia's daughter, Alex, goes to live with her father, while Craig raises Hugh with Gordon's help and advice, and the two become good friends. Gordon and Alex then meet again some years later when Alex becomes a counsellor at Keefer's school. They have a relationship and the story concludes with Alex giving birth to a daughter.
