= Cage of Stars =

2006 novel by Jacquelyn Mitchard

- Author: Jacquelyn Mitchard
- Language: English
- Publication date: 2006
- ISBN: 9780446578752

Cage of Stars is a 2006 best-selling novel by Jacquelyn Mitchard. The story follows a Mormon girl whose sisters are murdered, and her struggling to reconcile her faith and her family's forgiveness of the murderer with her grief, anger, and desire for revenge. Mitchard was inspired by a newspaper article about a similar murder in California.

== Summary ==
Young Veronica (“Ronnie”) Swan's idyllic life in her Mormon community of Cedar City, Utah is shattered when her two younger sisters, Becky and Ruthie, are brutally murdered by a man named Scott Early while Ronnie is babysitting for them. Amid mass media attention, a remorseful Early is diagnosed with schizophrenia and sent to a state mental hospital, where his condition is increasingly tempered by medication and therapy. Ronnie's parents, guided by their faith, decide they must forgive Early to find closure, and visit him in the hospital. Ronnie, however, refuses to join them. She moves to San Diego, California to become an EMT, adopts a new identity, and manages to become the nanny to Early's infant daughter Juliet, considering but ultimately abandoning the idea of revenge.

== Critical reception ==
Publishers Weekly called Cage of Stars "sweet and solid," noting the "considerable emotional depth" Ronnie develops throughout the story. Kirkus Reviews panned the book as "thinly conceived and timidly executed," criticizing the book's pacing and the development of the Mormon characters.
