= Bret Lott =

American novelist and academic (born 1958)

- Born: October 8, 1958 (age 67); Los Angeles, California, U.S.
- Education: California State University, Long Beach; University of Massachusetts Amherst (MFA)
- Occupations: Author and Professor of Creative Writing
- Spouse: Melanie Swank Lott

Bret Lott (born October 8, 1958) is the New York Times author and professor of English at the College of Charleston. He is Crazyhorse magazine's nonfiction editor and leads a study abroad program every summer to Spoleto, Italy.

Lott was appointed to the National Council of the Arts by President George W. Bush and served a six-year term. He was a Fulbright Senior American Scholar in 2006 and writer-in-residence at Bar-Ilan University in Tel Aviv, Israel. He was invited by Laura Bush to speak at the White House as part of the White House Symposium on “Classic American Stories” in 2004.

== Personal life ==
Born in Los Angeles, California in 1958, Lott grew up in Buena Park, California and Phoenix, Arizona, before returning to California to live in Huntington Beach. He met and married his wife of 40 years, Melanie Swank Lott, at First Baptist Church of Huntington Beach/Fountain Valley. A graduate of Cal State Long Beach (1981), Lott headed to Massachusetts for graduate school at UMass Amherst. He received his MFA in 1984 and landed his first teaching position at Ohio State University. In 1986, Lott joined the English Department at the College of Charleston, where he is now a tenured professor and director of the new MFA program.

== Awards and distinctions ==
- Recipient of the Ohio Arts Council Aid to Artists Fellowship in Literature for 1986–1987
- Recipient of the South Carolina Arts Commission Fellowship in Literature for 1987–1988
- Winner, PEN/NEA Syndicated Fiction Project Award, 1985, 1991, 1993
- Bread Loaf Fellow in Fiction, Bread Loaf Writers’ Conference, 1991
- Distinguished Research Award, College of Charleston, 1995
- Distinguished Alumni Award, University of Massachusetts, Amherst, 1999
- Chancellor's Medal, University of Massachusetts, 2000
- In Praise of Teaching Award, College of Charleston, January 2002
- Recipient, The Avalon Award for Excellence in the Arts, Lipscomb University, October 10, 2005
- Recipient, The Leila Lenore Heasley Prize for a Distinguished Representative of American and International Letters, Lyon College, 21 March 2006
- Recipient, The Denise Levertov Award, Seattle Pacific University, 8 May 2007
- Recipient, Fulbright Senior Scholar appointment as writer-in-residence, Bar-Ilan University, Tel Aviv, Israel, October 2006 through January 2007
- National Council on the Arts: Member, 2006–2012
- Appointed the Ferrol A. Sams Jr., Distinguished Chair in English, Mercer University, 2012

== Books ==
- The Man Who Owned Vermont. 1987.
- A Stranger's House. 1988.
- A Dream of Old Leaves. 1989.
- Jewel. 1991., an Oprah's Book Club selection made into a film Jewel (2001)
- Reed's Beach. 1991.
- How to Get Home. 1996.
- The Hunt Club. Villard. 1999.
- Fathers, Sons and Brothers. 2000.
- A Song I Knew by Heart. 2004.
- Before We Get Started: A Practical Memoir of the Writer's Life. 2005.
- The Difference Between Women and Men: Stories. 2005.
- Ancient Highway. 2008.
- Dead Low Tide. 2012.
- Letters and Life: On Being a Writer, On Being a Christian. 2013.
