= Lalita Tademy =

American writer (born 1948)

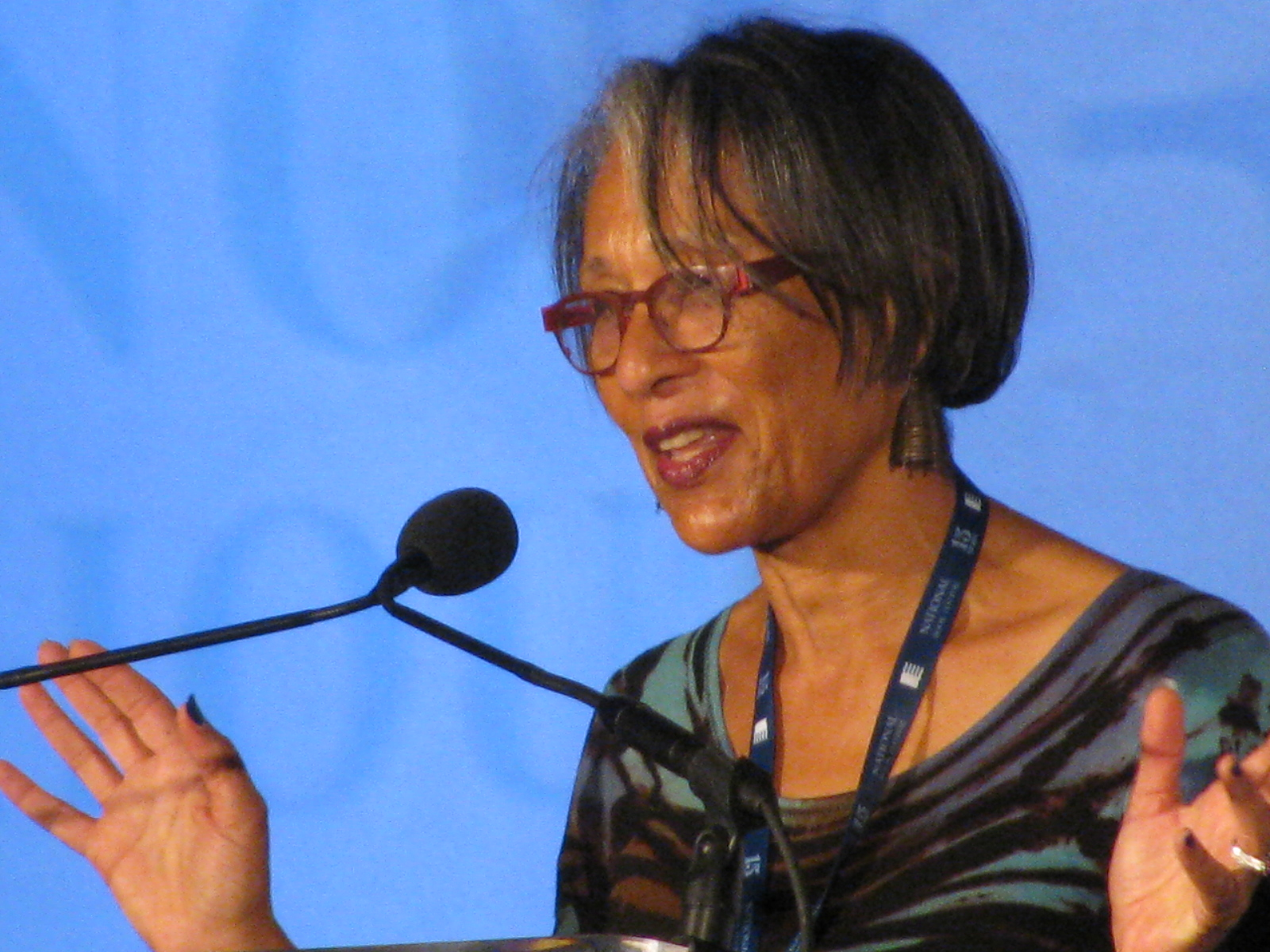
- Tademy during a presentation, 2015
- Born: Lalita L. Tademy; 26 December 1948 (age 77); Berkeley, California, US
- Writing career
- Notable works: Cane River (2001); Red River (2006); Citizen's Creek (2014)
- Website: www.lalitatademy.com

Lalita Tademy (born December 26, 1948) is an American novelist, speaker, businesswoman, and literary critic who is regarded as one of the central figures in African feminism of African diaspora. Her first novel and magnum opus, Cane River (2001), focused on history and black women in the 1950s and has shaped her perspective on the history of the United States. Along with Cane River, she has written Red River (2006) and Citizens Creek (2014). Her works are mostly historical non-fiction of feminist literature.

Born in Berkeley, California, Tademy's childhood was influenced during an era of slavery in the US. She started her honors program in Howard University and after two years, transferred to the University of California, Los Angeles, graduating in 1970, and earning her master's degree in 1972. After leaving her position as the vice president of Sun Microsystems, Tademy began researching about the history of her family; those she wrote as a book, Cane River in 2001. In less than eight years she would publish two other books.

Tademy's writings often explore themes of feminism and human relationships, particularly mother-child relationships. Her work has been recognized by various institutions, including The Oprah Winfrey Show in 2001 and San Francisco Public Library's One City One Book selection in 2007. She has also participated in the National Book Festival in 2007 and 2015. From 2001 to 2015, her novel Cane River was recommended reading for incoming students at Stanford University.

== Early life, background and education ==
Tademy was born on December 26, 1948, in Berkeley, California, the youngest of four children born to Nathan Green Tademy Jr. and Willie Dee Billes. Her maternal grandfather Joseph Billes, an immigrant from Southern France, lived in Louisiana as a timber worker. He had children with Emily Fredieu Billes, a former slave. Tademy's father, Nathan Tademy Jr., was the son of a sailor from Egypt who was sold as a slave to Louisiana.

Her father studied at Grambling State University, and served the U.S. Navy during World War II. After finding employment in Berkeley, California, he moved there with his wife, whom he had met in Louisiana. Due to the prevalent racism in the 1950s, the family moved in 1956 to Castro Valley, California, where Tademy began her education. She attended Parsons Elementary School, A.B. Morris Junior High School, and Castro Valley High School. Upon graduating as a National Merit Scholar, she started her honors program at Howard University, Washington D.C. After two years, she transferred to the University of California, Los Angeles (UCLA), to complete her education. Tademy earned her BSc in psychology in 1970 and her master's degree in business administration in 1972.

Tademy and her siblings grew up hearing stories about their grandmother Emily, also known as "Tite", from their mother. Tademy resides in Northern California with her husband, Barry Williams.

== Career ==
Tademy started working at Xerox Corporation, selling hardware. After 18 months, she moved to New York City to work in the marketing department of Philip Morris Inc., but returned to the San Francisco Bay Area (SFBA) after a year. In SFBA, she worked in the marketing department for the rapid transit system. In 1979, Tademy was hired as a product manager at Memorex Corporation, and later moved to ITT's Qume in 1981. After four years, she was hired by Alps Electric, a Japanese technology company looking to expand in the US, and eventually became the vice president, and later the general manager.

In 1992, Tademy was recruited by Sun Microsystems in Palo Alto, California, and became the vice president and general manager. She resigned in 1995 to focus on writing. Tademy began researching her family's past, particularly the stories about her grandmother, Emily, told by her mother. She used the National Archives and Records Building in San Bruno, and visited Louisiana, her family's place of origin. She also studied French works from Louisiana and hired a professional French genealogist to assist with translation. She wrote two short pieces based on her research, one of which was an op-ed published in the San Francisco Chronicle. To improve her writing skills, she enrolled in creative writing classes at Stanford University and the University of California.

=== Cane River (2001) ===
Tademy began researching her family history after leaving her job, and joined the Natchitoches Genealogical and Historical Association. Her manuscript was rejected 13 times before finding an agent. After several rewrites, which included reducing the page count from 800 to 400, her first book, Cane River, was published in 2001 by Warner Books. The book is a historical account of her African-American foremothers, dating back to the 1800s. The characters are based on her family members, including her great-grandmother Emily, who was a slave during the Civil War, her mother Philomene, and her grandmother Suzette. In an interview with Oprah Winfrey, Tademy explained that she left her job to study genealogy, leading to Cane River, because she "began to uncover the story after story of her ancestors, and just couldn't keep away from them."

Jabari Asim, an American author and poet, praised Tademy's description of the physical environment in the Washington Post. Katori Hall, reviewing for the Boston Globe, noted the authenticity lent by the inclusion of many black-and-white photographs, yellowed wills, and family letters.

=== Red River (2006) ===
Following the publication of Cane River, Tademy wrote her second book, Red River. The book is set in Colfax, Louisiana, and discusses the Colfax massacre. The book begins with the massacre at Colfax, where approximately 150 black men were killed by white individuals. The book explores the effects of the white supremacy on the black community during that era.

=== Citizen's Creek (2014) ===
Tademy's third book, Citizen's Creek, was published in 2014. The book tells the story of Cow Tom, a man who rose from being a slave to the head of the 'Creek tribe freedmen'. The book explores themes of hope and relationships, particularly the close relationship between Cow Tom and his granddaughter, Rose. The setting spans Oklahoma, Alabama, and Florida. The book also explores the relationship between the Native Americans and African Americans. The book, later narrated by Bahni Turpin and JD Jackson and published by Brilliance Audio, was a finalist for the Audie Award for fiction in 2016.

== Themes ==
Tademy's writings often reflect on the roles of African Americans. Her debut, Cane River, explores themes of violence and opposition to women using four generations of her maternal ancestors. Tademy illustrates the importance of the black woman through her family's genealogy. One of the recurring themes in her novels is the mother-daughter relationship, particularly in the context of the history of the United States. Other critics have noted her portrayal of the relationships between a slave and the master. Her literary work has heen said to be "a case in point to the diversity of family experiences among slaves."

=== Critical reception ===
Tademy's works have been recognized by various institutions. Cane River was listed on The New York Times Best Seller list in 2001, selected for the Oprah Winfrey Show in the same year, and chosen for the One City One Book by the San Francisco Public Library in 2007. Prior to the release of Citizen's Creek, the Chicago Public Library listed her for the Best Awards for adult fiction. Citizen's Creek won the BCALA Literary Award for fiction in 2015, and was a finalist for the Audie Award for Fiction in 2016. Tademy has also appeared at the National Book Festival by the Library of Congress in 2007 and 2015. Her book was selected as a standard entrance novel for new students in Stanford University from 2001 to 2015.

== Writings ==
Books

- ——— (2001). Cane River. Warner Books. ISBN 9780759522428.
- ——— (2006). Red River. Wheeler Pub. ISBN 9781597223782.
- ——— (2014). Citizens Creek. Simon and Schuster. ISBN 9781476753041.

Anthology

- Santana, Deborah, ed. (2018). All the Women in My Family Sing: Women Write the World--Essays on Equality, Justice, and Freedom (first ed.). Nothing But the Truth, LLC. ISBN 978-0-9972-9621-1.
