= Gary Aldrich =

FBI agent

Gary Warren Aldrich is a former FBI agent.

== Career ==
Gary Aldrich was a special agent with the FBI for 26 years investigating white-collar crime. He spent the latter part of his career working in the White House as a background investigator providing clearances to White House staff during the George H. W. Bush and Bill Clinton administrations. Aldrich retired from the Bureau in 1994. He wrote the 1996 book Unlimited Access: An FBI Agent Inside the Clinton White House (published by Regnery Publishing), which was highly critical of the Clinton administration.

== Controversy ==
As an agent who provided security to the White House, Aldrich gives much of the account in Unlimited Access from a first-hand perspective. He details the dismantling by the Clintons of normal security protocols that had been in place for six presidencies, something which permitted Clinton staffers of dubious background to enter sensitive areas. The book was published "to considerable controversy but great popularity." Aldrich acknowledged that "many events described in the book came to him second- and third-hand and that he had no evidence to corroborate them." The book's publication led to a response by Clinton White House officials, who "said the book was filled with demonstrably untrue information." The FBI's general counsel Howard Shapiro shared a copy of the manuscript with the Clinton administration while the FBI's review process was ongoing, which Aldrich interpreted as a political move designed to give the Clinton cohort time to form a public response. Though Unlimited Access relies on eyewitness testimony (Aldrich's own and that of other White House insiders), The New York Times opined that "in many ways the book is like the 'raw' F.B.I. reports in which agents collect unevaluated information." Aldrich was investigated by the FBI over his publication of the book without FBI authorization, but in 1997 the Department of Justice announced that no charges would be filed against him.

== Advocacy ==
In 1997, Aldrich formed a nonprofit organization, the Patrick Henry Center for Individual Liberty. He has made appearances on C-SPAN and published opinion columns at the conservative outlet Townhall.com.
