= Tawni O'Dell =

American novelist

- Born: 1964 (age 61–62); Indiana, Pennsylvania, U.S.
- Education: Indiana High School; Northwestern University
- Occupation: Novelist
- Writing career
- Notable works: Back Roads (2000); Coal Run (2004); Sister Mine (2007)

Tawni O'Dell (born 1964) is an American novelist. Her first published novel, Back Roads, was selected by Oprah Winfrey for Oprah's Book Club in March 2000.

== Formative years ==
Born and raised in Indiana, Pennsylvania in the United States, O'Dell grew up in the same town where movie actor Jimmy Stewart was born. The first in her family to attend college, she graduated from Indiana High School and then from Northwestern University with a degree in journalism.

She lived for many years in the Chicago area before moving back to Pennsylvania, where she now lives with her two children.

== Career ==
O'Dell disliked journalism and preferred writing fiction.

Her literary career, however, began with uncertainty. During a thirteen-year period, she wrote six unpublished novels and collected more than three hundred rejection slips before publishing her first novel, Back Roads. It was widely praised.

The July 24, 2000 issue of People magazine featured her in a story and mentioned that Oprah Winfrey described her not only as "an author but a writer."

== Works ==
- Back Roads, novel (New York: Viking, 2000)
- Coal Run, novel (New York: Viking, 2004)
- Sister Mine, novel (New York: Shaye Areheart Books, 2007)
- Fragile Beasts, novel (New York: Shaye Areheart Books, 2010)
- One of Us, novel (New York: Gallery Books, 2014)
- Angels Burning, novel (Gallery Books (5 Jan. 2016))
