= Jacquelyn Mitchard =

American journalist and author

- Born: Chicago, Illinois, U.S.
- Education: University of Illinois at Urbana-Champaign
- Occupation: Novelist
- Writing career
- Period: 1996–present
- Website: jackiemitchard.com

Jacquelyn Mitchard is an American journalist and author. She is the author of the best-selling novel The Deep End of the Ocean, which was the first selection for Oprah's Book Club, on September 17, 1996. Other books by Mitchard include The Breakdown Lane, Twelve Times Blessed, Christmas, Present, A Theory of Relativity, The Most Wanted, Cage of Stars, No Time to Wave Goodbye, Second Nature - A Love Story, and Still Summer.

She is a professor of creative writing at the Vermont College of Fine Arts.

== Biography ==
Born and raised in a suburb of Chicago, Illinois, Mitchard's father was a plumber, from Newfoundland, Canada, and her mother a hardware store clerk, a competitive horsewoman, and a member of the Lac du Flambeau Chippewa Cree tribe. She studied creative writing for three semesters under Mark Costello (author of The Murphy Stories) at the University of Illinois at Urbana-Champaign.

She became a newspaper reporter in 1979, eventually achieving a position as lifestyle columnist for the Milwaukee Journal Sentinel newspaper. Her weekly column, The Rest of Us: Dispatches from the Mother Ship, appeared in 125 newspapers nationwide until she retired it in 2007. Mitchard is a contributing editor for More (magazine) and is featured regularly in Reader's Digest, Good Housekeeping, Hallmark, Real Simple and other publications. Her nonfiction work includes the 1986 memoir 'Mother Less Child' (WW Norton) and essays in more than 30 anthologies.

Mitchard married Dan Allegretti, a reporter for The Capital Times, and the couple had three children (Robert, Daniel, and Martin). Dan also had a daughter, Jocelyn, from a previous marriage. After 13 years of marriage, Allegretti died of cancer at the age of 45 in 1993.

After the death of Allegretti, while working freelance for the Milwaukee Journal Sentinel and a part-time public relations position at the University of Wisconsin–Madison, she started writing her first novel, The Deep End of the Ocean. The idea for the story had come to her in a dream in the summer of 1993. She is an alum and distinguished fellow of the Ragdale Foundation, an artist's colony in Lake Forest, Illinois, where she went to write the first two chapters on the encouragement of author Jane Hamilton. After finishing the first six chapters, 70 pages, she received a contract with Viking Press in December 1994, for that book and a second one to be written later (The Most Wanted).

Bolstered by being featured by Oprah, the novel sold close to 3 million copies by May 1998. It has been Mitchard's only #1 New York Times Bestseller, on the list for 29 weeks, including 13 weeks at number 1. The book had originally reached number 14, but after being selected by Winfrey, sales jumped. The paperback would spend 16 weeks on the list. The film rights were sold to Mandalay Entertainment, and the story later became a feature film starring Michelle Pfeiffer.

But all of her other novels have been bestsellers as well as garnering critical acclaim—particularly for The Most Wanted, Cage of Stars and The Breakdown Lane. The Most Wanted was nominated for Britain's Orange Prize for Fiction and Cage of Stars for Britain's Spread The Word Prize.

In 2004 Mitchard published her first book for children and young adults. Her first children's picture book, Baby Bat's Lullaby, appeared in 2004 from HarperChildren's. Her two middle-grade novels, also published by HarperChildren's, Starring Prima!: The Mouse of the Ballet Jolie, and Rosalie, My Rosalie: The Tale of a Duckling appeared in 2004 and 2005. Her second children's picture book, Ready, Set, School!, appeared in 2007.

Now You See Her, Mitchard's first Young Adult novel, was published in 2007 by HarperTeen. All We Know of Heaven (HarperTeen) appeared in spring 2008, and the first in a series of Young Adult mysteries, The Midnight Twins (Razorbill/Penguin), based on the bewildering clairvoyant gift of twins Mallory and Meredith Brynn, debuted in summer 2008.

== Awards ==
Mitchard has won the Bram Stoker Award, Shirley Jackson Award, and Walkabout Prize (UK).

== Personal life ==
In 2011, Mitchard wrote that she and her husband had lost millions of dollars and most of their possessions to investment advisor Trevor Cook, who was convicted of operating a Ponzi Scheme.

== Bibliography ==
=== For adults ===
- Non-fiction/biography:
  - 1985: Mother Less Child — (W.W. Norton & Co.)
- Fiction:
  - 1996: The Deep End of the Ocean — (Viking Press)
  - 1998: The Most Wanted — (Viking Press)
  - 2001: A Theory of Relativity — (HarperCollins)
  - 2003: Christmas, Present — (HarperCollins)
  - 2003: Twelve Times Blessed — (HarperCollins)
  - 2005: The Breakdown Lane — (HarperCollins)
  - 2006: Cage of Stars — (Warner Books; ISBN 978-0-446-57875-2)
  - 2007: Still Summer — (Warner Books; ISBN 978-0-446-57876-9)
  - 2009: No Time to Wave Goodbye — (Random House; ISBN 978-1-4000-6774-9)
  - 2011: Second Nature: A Love Story - (Random House; ISBN 978-1-4000-6775-6)
  - 2016: Two if by Sea : A Novel - (Simon & Schuster; ISBN 978-1-5011-1557-8)
  - 2022: The Good Son -(MIRA; ISBN 978-0-7783-1179-9)
  - 2025: The Bird Watcher -(MIRA; ISBN 978-0-7783-6867-0)

=== For young adults ===
- Non-Fiction/biography:
  - 1992: Jane Addams: Pioneer in Social Reform and Activist for World Peace — (Gareth Stevens Children's Books)
- Fiction:
  - 2007: Now You See Her — (HarperCollins)
  - 2008: All We Know of Heaven — (HarperTeen)
  - 2008: The Midnight Twins — (Razorbill)
  - 2009: Look Both Ways — (Razorbill)
  - 2010: Watch For Me By The Moonlight - (Razorbill)
  - 2013: What We Saw at Night - (Soho Teen)
  - 2013: What We Lost in the Dark - (Soho Teen)

=== For children ===
- 2004: Baby Bat's Lullaby — (with Julia Noonan; HarperCollins)
- 2004: Starring Prima!: The Mouse of the Ballet Jolie — (with Tricia Tusa; HarperCollins)
- 2005: Rosalie, My Rosalie: The Tale of a Duckling — (with John Bendall-Brunello; HarperCollins)
- 2007: Ready, Set, School! — (with Paul Rátz de Tagyos; HarperCollins)

=== Essays ===
Mitchard's essays have appeared in:

  - 1997: The Rest of Us: Dispatches From the Mother Ship — (Viking Press; ISBN 978-0-670-87662-4)
  - 2005: A Love Like No Other: Stories from Adoptive Parents, edited by Pamela Kruger and Jill Smolowe (Riverhead)
  - 2006: My Father Married Your Mother, edited by Anne Burt (W.W. Norton)
  - 2007: Mr. Wrong: Real Life Stories About Men We Used to Love, edited by Harriet Brown (Ballantine)
  - 2007: Choice: True Stories of Birth, Contraception, Infertility, Adoption, Single Parenthood and Abortion, edited by Karen E. Bender and Nina de Gramont (McAdam Cage)
  - 2007: Altared: Bridezillas, Bewilderment, Big Love, Breakups and What Women Really Think About Contemporary Weddings, edited by Collen Curran (Vintage)
