= The Deep End of the Ocean =

1996 novel by Jacquelyn Mitchard

- First edition cover
- Author: Jacquelyn Mitchard
- Language: English
- Publisher: Allen Lane
- Publication date: June 1996
- Publication place: United States
- Media type: Print (hardback & paperback)
- Pages: 434 pp (hardback edition) & 528 pp (paperback edition)
- ISBN: 0-670-86579-6 (hardback edition) & ISBN 0-00-649909-0 (paperback edition)
- OCLC: 33443698
- Dewey Decimal: 813/.54 20
- LC Class: PS3563.I7358 D4 1996

The Deep End of the Ocean is a best-selling novel by Jacquelyn Mitchard, released in 1996. It is about an American middle class, suburban family that is torn apart when the youngest son is kidnapped and raised by a mentally ill woman, until he appears at the front doorstep of his real mother and asks if he can mow the lawn.

== Plot summary ==
Wisconsin photographer and housewife Beth Cappadora leaves her youngest son, Ben, alone with his older brother for a brief moment in a crowded Chicago hotel lobby, while attending her high school reunion. The older son lets go of Ben's hand and Ben vanishes without a trace. Beth goes into an extended mental breakdown and it is left to her husband and owner of a restaurant, Pat, to force his wife to robotically care for their remaining two children, 7-year-old Vincent and infant daughter Kerry.

Nine years later a young boy named Sam asks Beth if she needs the lawn mowed. Beth suspects that this boy who lives with his "father" two blocks away is in fact her lost son, and while Sam mows the lawn, she takes photographs of him to show to her husband and teenage son, who then says that he suspected the boy's true identity all along. The parents contact Detective Candy Bliss who pops in to offer wise, albeit often cryptic and conflicting, advice to Beth. It is learned that at the reunion in Chicago, the celebrity alumna Cecilia Lockhart kidnapped Ben, renamed him Sam, and raised him as her own child until she was committed to a mental hospital, leaving Sam to be raised in a house only two blocks from the Cappadoras, by his adoptive father, the sensitive and intellectual George Karras.

Ben was raised by a Greek-American father for nine years, while his biological parents are Italian-American. Ben is a polite, intelligent American boy who takes great pride in participating in Greek cultural rituals, much to the frustration of Pat who wants to pretend that Ben was never really abducted. Ben is faced with the cultural identity that he grew up with, and the cultural identity he would have known had he not been kidnapped.

Ben's adoptive father agrees to surrender Ben to his birth family, while still living two blocks away. Torn between two worlds and having lost both of the parents that he knew, Ben expresses suicidal feelings to Beth.

Ben's only memory of his biological family is one of brother Vincent and thus over a one-on-one basketball game he absolves his brother of any responsibility for his abduction, and agrees to return to live with the Cappadoras.

At the end of the novel, many conflicts remain unresolved. Pat still has problems loving his sons: Ben because he cannot relate to his personality and Vincent because he does not connect his teenage rebellion and cynicism to nine years of bad parenting. Beth has regained her position in the family as an equal parent, but Ben and Vincent's emotional scars may require years of intense therapy.

== Symbols, motifs, and themes ==
Aside from ethnicity, there is an underlined theme in the story about women's empowerment as Beth awakens from her nine-year depression to argue with Pat about how to deal with Ben's dual-ethnic and family identity. Once Beth finds Ben she also finds her own inner strength, and argues with Pat about the terms that Ben must obey in order to become integrated into the family. Pat wants Ben to abandon what he thought was his name, ethnic identity, and his father. Beth wants her son to be happy and feels that forcing Ben to abandon the past nine years of his life will only drive him away, both physically and emotionally.

Vincent sees the presence of Ben as a symbol of his own guilt at allowing his younger brother to be kidnapped, and a symbol of the anger that he has built up over the past nine years in living with parents that were too caught up in their grief to give him the love and attention that he needed. His younger sister seems the most well-adjusted of the children, but that is because she was too young to remember Ben. Vincent and Pat filled in the role as parents when Beth was trapped in her depression.

== Main characters ==
- Beth Cappadora – the main protagonist
- Ben/Sam – Beth's kidnapped son
- Vincent – Beth's oldest son, a sixteen-year-old boy
- Kerry – Beth's daughter, who was an infant when Ben was kidnapped
- Candy Bliss – the detective
- Cecilia Lockhart – the kidnapper of Ben
- Pat Cappadora – Beth's husband
- George Karras – Sam's adoptive father
- Angelo & Rosmary "Rosie" Cappadora – Beth's in-laws, Pat's parents
- Ellen – Beth's best friend

== Awards and nominations ==
The novel was the first Oprah's Book Club selection in September 1996. (ISBN 0-451-18692-3)

== Adaptations ==
There was a 1999 film of the same name based on the novel. The film is rated PG-13 for some profanity, and drama. It stars Michelle Pfeiffer and Treat Williams. This was Ryan Merriman's first feature film role.
