= Sonny J Mason =

- Also known as: Sonny J Mason Osuji
- Born: Justin Osuji; Glasgow, Scotland
- Genres: R&B, pop
- Occupations: Producer, songwriter, vocalist
- Instruments: DAW, drums, bass, guitar
- Years active: 1998–present
- Labels: BMG Chrysalis, Innocent, Virgin
- Website: Sonny J Mason on Twitter

Justin Osuji (born in Glasgow, Scotland), best known by his current alias Sonny J Mason, is a Scottish singer, songwriter, and producer whose style combines "hints of R&B, soul, funk and disco." Mason was signed as a singer-songwriter to Virgin Records at age 14, and his first four singles, released under the name Justin, all reached top 40 positions on the UK Singles Chart in the late 1990s. His debut album Finally was released in 2000 on Innocent Records, and that year he was awarded the Young Scottish Achievers Award from Queen Elizabeth II.

His first album as Sonny J Mason, the EP Life Is the Music, was released in 2008, and he has since appeared as a guest vocalist on tracks by artists such as deep house DJ Miguel Migs. As a producer, Mason has remixed or produced tracks for artists such as Faith Evans, Pleasure P, Kimbra, Gabrielle, Loveable Rogues, the Wanted, and Elyar Fox and has co-written music with songwriters and producers such as No I.D., Mike Elizondo, Big Jim, Warren Campbell, Keefus Ciancia, Dee Kay, Karen Poole, Andy Taylor, and Henry Jackman. In 2012, Mason co-wrote the song "Come into My Head" with New Zealand pop artist Kimbra and Keith Ciancia. The song won two awards at the International Songwriting Competition in 2013.

In 2012, he co-wrote a song on Faith Evans' album R&B Divas, which in 2014 was nominated for a Grammy Award. In 2014, he co-wrote a song on Kimbra's album The Golden Echo, also playing drums on the track. The album went on to peak at No. 43 on the Billboard 200 chart. Released on 24 July 2015, the debut single "Get Stupid" by British entertainer Aston Merrygold featured primary production and co-writing by Mason. The track peaked at No. 10 on the ARIA Charts and achieved platinum status in Australia.

== Early life ==
Justin Osuji was born in Glasgow, Scotland, where he was also raised. He is of Glaswegian and Nigerian heritage. He attended Saint Thomas Aquinas Secondary School, and began writing music as a teenager under his full name Justin Osuji, or simply "Justin".

== Music career ==
=== 1998–2001: As Justin ===
Osuji was signed to a recording contract with Virgin Records UK in 1998 at age 14, after appearing on the BBC Television programme, The Fame Game. Virgin recorded several songs he had written, and Osuji began releasing singles on both Streamline Records and Virgin UK under the name Justin. His first four singles all reached top 40 positions on the UK Singles Chart. The first release was "This Boy" (UK #34) in August 1998. His second single, "Over You" (his biggest hit to date, reaching UK #11), was released in 1999, and taken from his debut album, Finally, released in 2000 on Innocent Records. His third single was "It's All About You" (UK #34), whilst his fourth "Let It Be Me" (UK #15), was a cover version of the song first made famous by The Everly Brothers. At the time he was still in secondary school, and revising for his forthcoming GCSEs.

In 2000, he was awarded the Young Scottish Achievers Award, from Queen Elizabeth II, at Edinburgh's Holyrood Palace.

=== 2002–08: Early production ===
By the fall of 2004, he was working as a singer-songwriter and producer under the name Justin Osuji. His style combines "hints of R&B, soul, funk and disco." Working in genres such as grime, hip hop and R&B, he has utilized the sounds of house as well. Mason has remixed or produced tracks for UK artists such as Craig David, Sugababes, Richie Dan, Artful Dodger and So Solid, and has co-written music with producers and songwriters such as Pam Sheyne (Christina Aguilera), Henry Jackman (Seal) and Rick Mitra (Lu Lu, Christina Aguilera).

=== 2008–09: Salted Music releases ===
As of 2007, Osuji was based in both London and Los Angeles. He released the solo EP Life Is the Music on 19 August 2008 on Salted Music, a dance music label based in San Francisco and operated by Miguel Migs. Released on both CD and 12" vinyl, Life Is the Music was his first solo release under the name Sonny J. Mason. That year the EP's single "Life Is the Music" was included on the compilation Stereo Sushi, Vol. 14, released on Hed Kandi. About "Life Is the Music," the song "is a midtempo soul stomper with classic hip hop and R&B flavor."

Around 2008, he was collaborating with Andy Taylor of Duran Duran, who described him as "the best part of Michael Jackson, the funkiest part of Prince and the elaborate part of Sly Stone," comparing the sound of their collaborations to Power Station.

He moved to Los Angeles in 2009, and was signed as an artist to Warner Bros by notable record producer Lenny Waronker.

After signing to Salted Music, he began appearing as a guest vocalist as Sonny J. Mason, first on "HOT!" by Audioslam in 2009. This was followed in 2010 by "Burnin' Up", released by Miguel Migs on Salted Music. Migs later released a remix of Mason's "Life Is the Music," and in 2011 Mason contributed vocals to Migs' song "Changin'," which Migs' included on his studio album Outside the Skyline.

=== 2012–14: Recent years ===
He moved back to the UK in 2011. In 2012 Mason co-wrote the song "Come into My Head" with New Zealand pop artist Kimbra and Keith Ciancia. The song was released on Vows, a full-length studio album by Kimbra. "Come into My Head" won first place for both performance and music video at The International Songwriting Competition (ISC) in 2013. The song has received positive reviews from critics. Cole Waterman of PopMatters stated that the song has "funk swagger," and Erin Brady of Interview magazine wrote: "Blending elements of pop and '70s funk with expansive vocals, 'Come Into My Head' ricochets from relative calm to full-blown groove as effortlessly as it does from interior to exterior, imagination to actuality." "Come into My Head" was also featured during the end credits and on the soundtrack for the 2013 film The Heat.

In 2013, Mason released two official remixes: "Change Your Life (Sonny J Mason Radio Mix)" by Little Mix, and "What a Night (ft. Lucky Mason)" by the band Loveable Rogues. Loveable Rogues announced the release of their debut album This and That for 11 August 2014. The album was recorded with Mason. He has also collaborated with artists such as Swedish house DJ and producer Alex P, and has had recent collaborations with musician and songwriter Mike Elizondo and No I.D. In 2014, he co-wrote a song on Kimbra's album The Golden Echo, also playing drums on the track. The album went on to peak at No. 5 on both the New Zealand Albums chart and the Australia Albums chart. It also reached No. 43 on Billboards The Billboard 200 chart. Released on 24 July 2015, the debut single "Get Stupid" by British entertainer Aston Merrygold featured primary production and co-writing by Mason. The track peaked at No. 10 on the ARIA Charts in Australia and went on to reach platinum certification

== Personal life ==
As of 2012, Mason was based in London.

== Awards and nominations ==
Year	Award	Nominated work	Category	Result
2000	The Young Scottish Achievers Award	Justin	Artist	Won
2000	Scottish Clef Award	Justin	Artist	Nominated
2013	The International; Songwriting Competition	"Come into My Head"	Performance	Won
2013	The International; Songwriting Competition	"Come into My Head"	Music Video	Won
2014	Grammy Awards	"Too High For Love"	Best R&B album	Nominated

== Discography ==
=== Albums ===
Albums and EPs by Sonny J Mason
Year	Album title	Release details
2000	Finally (as Justin)	Released: 2000; Label: Innocent Records; Format: CD
2008	Life Is the Music – EP (as Sonny J Mason)	Released: 19 August 2008; Label: self-released; Format: CD, digital, 12" vinyl

=== Singles ===
Selected singles by Sonny J Mason
Year	Title	Chart peaks		Album	Label, Certifications
Year	Title	UK	—	Album	Label, Certifications
1998	"This Boy" (as Justin)	34	—	Non-album single	Virgin, Streamline
1999	"Over You" (as Justin)	11	—	Finally	Innocent, Virgin
1999	"It's All About You" (as Justin)	34	—	Finally	Innocent
2000	"Let It Be Me" (as Justin)	15	—	Non-album single	Innocent, Virgin
2008	"Life Is the Music" (as Sonny J. Mason)	—	—	Life Is the Music	Salted Music
2012	"Wake Up" (as Sonny J Mason)	—	—	Wake Up	BMG Chrysalis

=== Remixes ===
- 2013: Loveable Rogues feat. Lucky Mason - "What a Night" (Sonny J Mason remix)
- 2013: Little Mix - "Change Your Life" (Sonny J Mason radio mix)

=== Compilation appearances ===
- 2008: Stereo Sushi, Vol. 14 (Hed Kandi/Stereo Sushi) – track "Life Is the Music"

=== Guest appearances ===
Selected songs featuring Sonny J Mason as vocalist
Year	Single name	Primary artist(s)	Album	Label
2001	"24/7" (radio mix) (feat. Justin)	Fixate	—N/a	E-Park
2009	"HOT!" (feat. Sonny J Mason)	Audioslam	—N/a	Sound Solution
2010	"Burnin' Up" (feat. Sonny J Mason)	Miguel Migs	—N/a	Salted Music
2011	"Changin'" (feat. Sonny J Mason)	Miguel Migs	Outside the Skyline	Salted Music

=== Production and writing credits ===
Selected songs featuring Sonny J Mason as producer or writer
Year	Title	Primary artist	Chart peaks							Album	Role
Year	Title	Primary artist	UK Digi	SCOT	US R&B	IRE	BEL	AUS	UK	Album	Role
2010	"Burnin' Up" (feat. Sonny J Mason)	Miguel Migs	—	—	—	—	—	—	—	N/A	Co-writer
2011	"Changin'"	Miguel Migs	—	—	—	—	—	—	—	N/A	Writer, featured artist
2012	"Come into My Head"	Kimbra	—	—	—	—	—	—	—	Vows	Co-writer, bass guitar
2012	"Too High for Love"	Faith Evans	—	—	—	—	—	—	—	R&B Divas (Grammy nomination – Best R&B Album 2014)	Co-writer
2012	"Out the Water"	Fabio Lendrum	—	—	—	—	—	—	—	N/A	Co-writer
2013	"Show Me What You Got"	Gabrielle	—	—	—	—	—	—	—	Now and Always: 20 Years of Dreaming	Producer, writer, all instruments
2013	"What a Night"	Loveable Rogues	—	—	—	47	—	—	9	N/A	Co-producer, guitar, synths
2014	"Glow in the Dark"	The Wanted	—	—	—	—	88	—	177	Word of Mouth	Co-writer, guitar
2014	"If We're Alright"	The Wanted	—	—	—	—	—	—	—	Word of Mouth	Co-writer, producer, all instruments
2014	"Still Here"	Gene Noble	—	—	5	—	—	—	—	N/A	Producer, writer
2014	"A Billion Girls"	Elyar Fox	—	—	—	—	—	—	11	N/A	Co-writer, producer, background vocals, all instruments
2014	"Love in High Places"	Kimbra	—	—	—	—	—	—	—	The Golden Echo (No. 5 NZ, No. 5 AUS, No. 43 US)	Co-writer, drums
2015	"Get Stupid"	Aston Merrygold	16	15	—	72	—	10	28	N/A	Producer, writer, all instruments
2018	"Wow Thing"	Seulgi, SinB, Chungha, Soyeon	—	—	—	—	—	—	—	N/A	Writer, arranger
"—" denotes a recording that did not chart or was not released in that territory.

== See also ==
- Salted Music
