= Tim K =

- Born: Timothy John Kvasnosky; Seattle, Washington, U.S.
- Genres: Electronic, house, hip hop, jazz, alternative dance, indietronica
- Occupations: Producer, composer, musician, arranger, keyboardist
- Instrument: keyboard
- Years active: 2000–present
- Member of: Tiny Hearts, Dede
- Website: http://www.timkmusic.com

Timothy John Kvasnosky, known professionally as Tim K, is an American record producer, musician, film score composer and Creative Director. Tim K composed the score (along with collaborator Jake Shears of the Scissor Sisters) to the 2015 Sundance Film Festival select I Am Michael, starring James Franco. In 2016, he scored "King Cobra" starring Christian Slater and James Franco which documented the real life murder of porn producer Bryan Kocis. As a producer and sideman has also worked with artists such as Sam Sparro, Ed Droste, Jake Shears, Rahzel, Lisa Shaw, Kat DeLuna, Dam Funk, Miguel Migs and DJ Colette. He is a member of the musical group Tiny Hearts. As a remixer, he produced 4 top 5 Billboard Club Play remixes. He has also scored commercials for Nike, Target, Corona, Friskies, Volkswagen, Bulgari, Google and McDonald's. His Friskies commercial composition "Adventureland" was featured during the 2010 Winter Olympics.

== Background ==
At the age of five, he began classical piano lessons. At the age of 11, he began playing jazz saxophone. By high school, he was playing as a jazz pianist sideman in Seattle, and was also the DJ in a local hiphop crew. He attended NYU jazz performance program with concentration in Piano, where he jammed in his dorm room with Bosco Mann. He studied with Frank Kimbrough, Arturo O'Farrill and Don Friedman. He has been a keyboard sideman with Sam Sparro, Lisa Shaw, Kat DeLuna, Rahzel, Orchestra Clave, Miguel Migs and DJ Colette.

== Film ==
In 2025, he composed the original score for Pretty Thing, an American erotic thriller directed by Justin Kelly. Released theatrically on July 4, 2025, by Shout! Studios, the film stars Alicia Silverstone and Karl Glusman. The soundtrack was released by Obscura Editions on July 7, 2025, and incorporates processed piano, modular synthesizer, layered vocals, and tape manipulation. Reviews of the film noted the score's contribution to its atmosphere. Variety described a “wordless vocal element that carries an echo of posh 1960s European soundtracks.” Bloody Disgusting cited the score's “twinkly harp and piano” as contributing to the film's “hypnotic dreaminess.” High On Films wrote that “the heavy-lifting is left to Tim Kvasnosky’s music to crank up the unsettling mood.”

In 2018, Tim K scored JT Leroy starring Kristen Stewart and Laura Dern. The film is a biographical drama film that tells the story of Laura Albert, a woman who wrote and published a series of books under the pseudonym JT LeRoy, a young transgender man. The score featured an avant garde small ensemble woodwind score.

In 2016, Tim K scored King Cobra, starring James Franco, Christian Slater and Molly Ringwald about the death of porn producer Bryan Kocis. It premiered at the Tribeca Film Festival. The score was well received, the music praised as "effervescent electronic score" by Screen Daily.

In 2015, he composed score to Buried Above Ground, a documentary by director Ben Selkow.

In 2014, Tim K composed the score, with Jake Shears of the Scissor Sisters, to Justin Kelly directed, Gus Van Sant produced I Am Michael starring James Franco and Emma Roberts The film was selected for domestic premiere at the Sundance Film Festival in 2015, and internationally at the Berlin International Film Festival.

Filmography
Year	Title	Director	Studio	Notes
2025	Pretty Thing	Justin Kelly	Shout! Studios	Starring Alicia Silverstone and Karl Glusman. Released July 4, 2025. Soundtrack released on Obscura Editions (July 7, 2025).
2018	JT LeRoy	Justin Kelly	Universal Pictures (U.S. release)	Starring Kristen Stewart and Laura Dern. Premiered at Toronto International Film Festival (2018).
2018	Welcome The Stranger	Justin Kelly	Sony Pictures	Starring Abbey Lee, Caleb Landry Jones and Riley Keough. Premiered at Toronto International Film Festival (2018).
2017	Gaga: Five Foot Two	Chris Moukarbel	Netflix; Live Nation	No formal composer, scored some scenes. Documentary starring Lady Gaga. Premiered at Toronto International Film Festival (2017); streaming release on Netflix September 22, 2017.
2017	Legendary Place	Calvin Wong	Cartoon Network Studios	Short film. March 4, 2017 (GLAS Festival)
2016	Call Your Father (short)	Jordan Firstman	[Independent]	Directed by and starring Jordan Firstman.
2016	King Cobra	Justin Kelly	IFC Films	Starring James Franco, Christian Slater, and Molly Ringwald. Premiered at Tribeca Film Festival (2016).
2015	Buried Above Ground	Ben Selkow	[Independent/Documentary]	Documentary film.
2014	I Am Michael	Justin Kelly	IFC Films	Starring James Franco, Emma Roberts, and Zachary Quinto. Premiered at Sundance Film Festival (2015) and Berlin International Film Festival (2015).

== Producer/songwriter ==
Tim K has produced records in variety of electronic music styles, often with jazz influences.

In 2017, he produced Sam Sparro's "Christmas In Blue" EP, which featured some classic carols in a vintage 1960s jazz style production. The independently release EP reached No. 25 on the Billboard Jazz Chart.

He produced and co-released Honey Dijon's debut album Best of Both Worlds, released on Defected Records UK.

He has been a longtime producer and songwriter for DJ Colette, for whom he produced three albums. When writing, he often starts with a melodic keyboard part and builds drums, and vocal melodies around it. Her "Italo-disco-owing" and "indelible electro" album When The Music's Loud, featuring all compositions co-written and many produced by Tim K, was released in September 2013. The album was named by Vice as one of the 99 Greatest Dance Albums of all time. The album was also named as one of Billboard 's Top 20 Dance albums of 2013.

In December 2013, he produced and co-wrote debut single "War Of Hearts" for artist Russell Taylor, helping him win VH1 Artist You Oughta Know award, which he performed live December 2, 2013 on Big Morning Buzz Live.

A longtime vintage recording technique aficionado, using vintage microphones, techniques, tape and James Brown's old mixer, he recorded Shoshana Bean's second album O'Farrell Street in 2012 at North Hollywood. With JT Donaldson, in 2012 Tim K also produced underground hip hop group Hawthorne Headhunter's "Sum People Don't Change" from their debut LP Myriad of Now on Plug Research. Tim K lent a hand to The System's 2012 release for beatmaker David Frank's production "Mother Ungh Ungh", providing some "stutter" style edit of Mic Murphy's vocals.

In 2011, with Fab Dupont Tim K co-produced, played vintage keyboards and added additional production to many of the tracks on Les Nubians' Nu Revolution album.

In 2010, Tim K co-produced Dâm-Funk's Hood Pass Intact's "highlight" track "How It Be Between You and Me" on Stones Throw Records. The album received a favorable Pitchfork rating. Later in the year, a track he produced, "Stressin'" featuring Kissey was selected for Mark Farina's Mushroom Jazz compilation, volume 7. Also in 2010, Tim K produced the lead single "Slow Recovery" for Lucy Woodward's Hooked album for Verve Records.

== Home & Garden ==
Tim K worked with DJ/Producer Timothy Shumaker under the moniker Home & Garden starting in 2000. They released 12" singles and remixes for labels such as Atlantic Records, Reprise Records and Warner Bros. Records. Their debut full-length record Domesticated was released on Om Records in 2007. It featured appearances from Derrick Carter, Lisa Shaw, DJ Colette, Lucy Woodward, Chez Damier and Mic Murphy.

== Songs featured in video games ==
Year	Song	Artist	Credits	Video game (platform)	Placement / Station	Notes
2018	"State of Confusion"	Honey Dijon feat. Joi Cardwell	co-written by Tim K	Forza Horizon 4 (Xbox One, Xbox Series X/S, PC)	Horizon Bass Arena	Also appears on Honey Dijon's album The Best of Both Worlds.
2020	"Thunda"	Honey Dijon & Tim K feat. John Mendelsohn	co-written by Tim K	Grand Theft Auto V / GTA Online (PS4/PS5, Xbox One/Series X/S, PC)	Music Locker Radio	Featured with the Cayo Perico era radio programming.

== Tiny Hearts ==
Tim K is currently working a collaborative project, Tiny Hearts with producer Waajeed and vocalist Dede Reynolds. Their debut EP Stay will be released on Detroit's Dirt Tech Reck label. Their initial video "Centerfold" was released in September 2013. A live performance of Tiny Hearts was featured on Boilerroom.tv. His composition for the group, "Snow Cold", was featured on NPR's Here and Now late in 2013.

== Commercial and other work ==
Friskies tapped Tim K to compose music for its "Adventureland" Campaign, featured in the Winter Olympics, as well as in 3D at movie theatre venues across the US. The 9 commercial campaign featured singer Deanne Reynolds of Tiny Hearts. The commercial was listed as Advertising Age's Ad of the week. In 2013, Tim K composed the music for Nike's KDV shoe release.

== Awards and recognition ==
Awards and recognition
Year	Award	Work	Category / Result	Role / credit
2023	Cannes Lions	Clash From the Past	Grand Prix — Entertainment Lions; Grand Prix — Entertainment Lions for Gaming	ECD for music; composer for the "Clash 8-Bit" segment
2024	The One Club Awards	Don't Make Your Future You Hate You — NerdWallet	Two Merit awards	ECD
2025	Clio Sports	TOO EASY — Jordan Brand	Bronze — Film Craft/Music	Composer and ECD
2026	Webby Awards	One of A'Kind — Nike	Webby Winner — Best Original Music or Music Supervision	ECD

== Selected discography and chart performance ==
Year	Artist	Album/Song(s)	Details
2025	Tim K	Pretty Thing Original Score Album	Artist and Composer
2025	Nomi Ruiz	Go Be Gone	Keyboards
2025	Shea Coulee	YOUR NAME	Mastering Engineer
2023	Lola Consuelos	Paranoia Silverlining	Producer featured in film Pretty Thing
2022	Honey Dijon	Stand	Co-writing, Engineering, Vocal Arrangement
2022	Forq	Mr. Bort (Tim K Remix)	Remixer
2022	Sam Sparro	Everything	Co-writing
2022	Jake Shears	Meltdown	Remix
2022	Maluca Mala	Trakalosa	Mixer
2019	Morrissey	Morning Starship	Additional Engineering, Vocal Arranging
2019	Honey Dijon and Tim K featuring Nomi Ruiz	Why on Cafe Del Mar Vol XXV	Producer, Engineer, Mixer, Keyboards
2019	Semma	Ribbons and Bows	Keyboards, Co Writing
2018	Duke Dumont	Inhale	Keyboards
2018	Kelela & Girl Unit	WYWD	Co-writing, Keyboards
2017	Honey Dijon featuring Nomi Ruiz, Joi Cardwell, Sam Sparro	Best Of Both Worlds	Producer, Engineer, Mixer, Keyboards
2017	DEDE & Ed Droste of Grizzly Bear	Faultline	Co-Producer, Engineer, Mixer, Co-writer
2017	Kingdom featuring Syd of The Internet	Nothin	Additional Production, Keyboards, Co-writer
2017	Sam Sparro	Christmas In Blue	Producer, Engineer, Mixer, Piano
2017	Gavin Turek	Good Look For You	Producer, Engineer, Multi-instrumentalist
2017	Dawn Richard	Infrared EP	Co-writing, Keyboards, Mixing
2016	Complex Movements with Invincible (rapper) and Waajeed	Apple Orchards	Mixing, Add'l Arrangement, Orchestration, Keys
2013	Shoshana Bean	O'Farrell Street	Producer, Engineer
2013	DJ Colette	When The Music's Loud	Producer, Engineer, Musician, Co-Writer
2013	Tiny Hearts	Stay Ep	Co-Producer, Engineer, Musician, Co-Writer
2013	Russell Taylor	War Of Hearts	Producer, Engineer, Musician, Co-Writer
2012	Radical Something	Cutty Spot	Writing, Add'l Keys
2011	The System	Mother Ungh Ungh	Additional Production
2011	Les Nubians	Afro Dance	Producer, Keyboards
2011	Anuhea	Big Deal	Songwriter
2010	Lucy Woodward	Slow Recovery	Producer, Arranger, Keyboards
2010	Kirk Whalum featuring Isaac Hayes	I Loved You In Memphis	Remixer
2010	Dam Funk	How Will It Be Between U & Me	Co-Producer, Mixer, Instrumentalist
2010	Kissey	Stressin' Mushroom Jazz Vol 7	Producer, Mixer, Instrumentalist, Co-Writer
2010	Lisa Shaw	Can You See Him	Producer, Arranger, Keyboards
2008	Home & Garden featuring Derrick Carter	Domesticated	Producer, Keyboards, Co-writing
2008	Home & Garden featuring Chez Damier	In & Out	Producer, Keyboards, Co-writing
2007	Fred Everything featuring Lisa Shaw	Here I Am	String Arrangement
2007	Janita	Seasons Of Life	Remixer, Keyboards
2004	Esthero	OG Bitch	Remixer
2004	Debi Nova	One Rhythm	Remixer
2004	Greenskeepers	Go	Remixer

Year	Title	Peak Position Billboard Hot Dance Club Songs	Credit
2003	Lucy Woodward "Blindsided (Dance Mixes)"	1	Remixer
2004	Esthero "O.G. Bitch (H&G Remix)"	1	Remixer
2004	Debi Nova "One Rhythm (H&G Remix)"	1	Remixer
2007	DJ Colette "If"	5	Composer
