= Free (Lisa Shaw album) =

Studio album by Lisa Shaw
- Released: March 10, 2009
- Genre: House; R&B; soul; dance; downtempo; electronica
- Length: 60:09
- Label: Salted Music
- Producer: Miguel Migs; Dave Warrin

Lisa Shaw chronology
Cherry (2005)	Free (2009)

Free is the second solo album by Canadian singer Lisa Shaw, released in 2009 on Salted Music.

== Recording ==
The album was produced by Dave Warrin, Tim K, Ethan White (of Tortured Soul), and Miguel Migs. Shaw performed the album at release on KCRW's Morning Becomes Eclectic, with producer Tim K and DJ Joshua Heath.

== Track listing ==
1. "Better Days" – 3:49
2. "Honey" – 4:52
3. "Find the Way" – 5:34
4. "Like I Want To" – 5:23
5. "Free" – 5:25
6. "Music in You" – 4:43
7. "All Night High" – 5:58
8. "Feel" – 4:25
9. "Can You See Him" – 5:10
10. "I'm Okay" – 4:58
11. "Tomorrow" – 4:46
12. "Inside My Love" – 3:34
13. "Sky High" – 3:49

== Personnel ==
- Tony Espinoza – mastering, mixing
- Matthias Heilbronn – engineer
- Tim Kvasnosky – composer, producer
- Miguel Migs – composer, mixing, producer
- Lisa Shaw – vocals, composer
- Dave Warrin – composer, keyboards, producer
- Ethan White – composer, producer
