= Tiny Hearts =

- Origin: Detroit, Michigan, United States
- Genres: Post-Trap, Trap, Trip Hop, Electronic music
- Years active: 2011–present
- Label: Dirt Teck Reck
- Members: Waajeed; Tim K
- Website: www.tinyhearts.net

Tiny Hearts is an American trip-hop/electronic music trio formed in 2011 from Detroit. Tiny Hearts is composed of producer Waajeed (of Platinum Pied Pipers), producer/composer Tim K (Tim Kvasnosky) and vocalist Deanne Reynolds of DEDE.

== Background ==
The band met in Detroit. The music features the bombastic, aggressive drum programming of Waajeed, the deep poetic songwriting, vocoder and harmonically intense keyboard playing of Tim K and the icy, haunting tones of singer Dede Reynolds

The music of Tiny Hearts internationally premiered on BBC1 on Benji B's show in late 2012. The show premiered songs "Centerfold", "Monsters" and "Dark Eyes". The band writes and record in an intense and isolated environment, for several weeks at a time. Waajeed is the leader in terms of creative identity. Tim K writes the lyrics and melodies and they mix the music together.

The U.S. radio premiere was in 2013 on KCRW, on the Garth Trinidad show. In October 2013, KEXP added the band's track "Stay" into rotation.

The first video for Tiny Heart's song "Centerfold" premiered on Okayplayer website 9/4/13, directed by Aron Kantor. The song utilizes "melodic and lyrical potency" and "floating" vocals over "thumping bass". Their second video "Stay", directed by Justin Kelly, and shot by DP Chris Blauvelt, premiered on Pigeons & Planes October 1, 2013.

Tiny Hearts performed a Boilerroom.tv show, featuring the tracks from their forthcoming Stay EP, hosted by KCRW DJ Garth Trinidad. Their song "Stay" was selected as "Song of the Week" by Pigeons and Planes September 20, 2013. Their song "Stay" was featured in a Vice magazine underground culture documentary.

The band's song "Snow Cold" was featured on NPR's Here & Now on November 12, 2013. The hosts described the music as a "great electronic sound" with a "cool, surreal mood".

The "Snow Cold" video premiered on Vice Noisey Feb 11, 2014. It was directed by Timothy Shumaker and included Art Direction of lead singer Dede.

== Discography ==
=== EPs ===
- Stay – (2013, Dirt Teck Reck), mastered by Fab Dupont

=== Remixes ===
- "Reconstruct (Tiny Hearts Remix)" – (2013, Dirt Teck Reck)

=== Videos ===
- "Snow Cold" – (2014, Dirt Tech Reck), directed by Timothy Shumaker
- "Stay" – (2013, Dirt Tech Reck), directed by Justin Kelly, cinematography by Christopher Blauvelt
- "Centerfold" – (2013, Dirt Tech Reck), directed by Aron Kantor
