= Follow Your Heart (Cubic Zirconia album) =

Studio album by Cubic Zirconia
- Released: 20 September 2011
- Recorded: 2009, Seedy Underbelly, Los Angeles, California
- Genre: Funk, house, neo-soul
- Length: 49:30
- Label: Fool's Gold Records
- Producer: John Kuker, Cubic Zirconia

Follow Your Heart is the debut album by electronic dance music group Cubic Zirconia. The album was released by Fool's Gold Records on September 20, 2011.

== Track listing ==
1. "Yellow Spaceship Pt 2"
2. "Darko"
3. "Black Hole"
4. "Summertime"
5. "Treats"
6. "Take Me High"
7. "Freebase You"
8. "Follow Your Heart"
9. "Cherry Nights" (feat. Coultrane)
10. "Runnin In And Out Of Love" (feat. Drop The Lime)
11. "Don’t Be Scared Of My Love"
12. "I Got What You Need" (feat. Dam-Funk)
13. "Night Or Day" (feat. Bilal)

== Personnel ==
- Tiombe Lockhart - vocals
- Nick Hook - keyboards, production
- Daud Sturdivant - keyboards, percussion
- Jamire Williams - drums
- Lenny Castro - percussion
- John Kuker - production
