= Dede (band) =

American dream pop and post-rock duo

DEDE
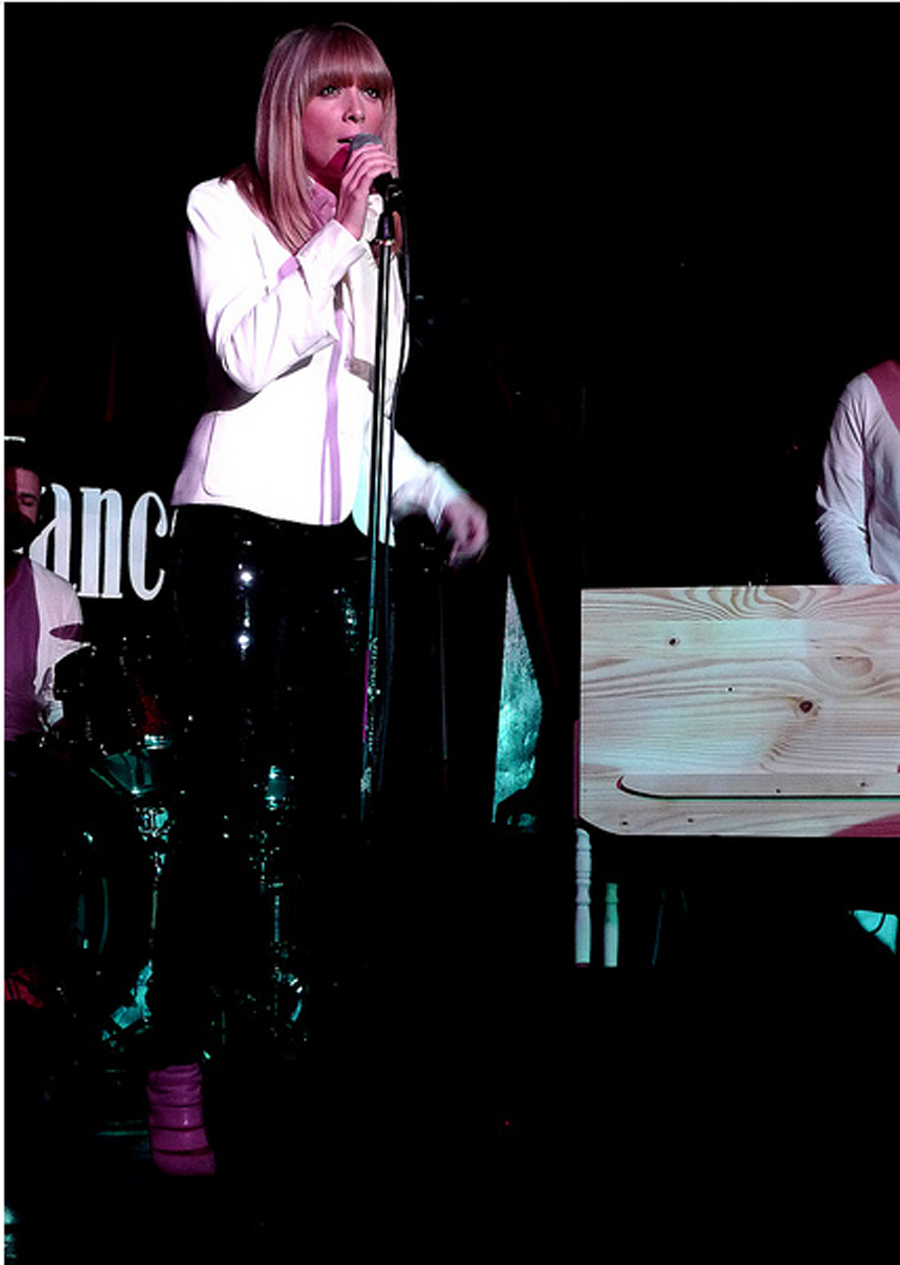
- DEDE at the Delancey, NYC, 2011

Background information
- Origin: Brooklyn, New York, United States
- Genres: Dream Pop, post-rock
- Years active: 2009–present
- Label: Unsigned
- Spinoffs: Tiny Hearts
- Members: Tim K Deanne Reynolds
- Website: www.dedemusic.com. www.myspace.com/dedemusic75

DEDE is an American dream pop and post-rock duo formed in 2009 in Brooklyn, NY, consisting of singer and Wisconsin native Deanne Reynolds and Seattle native Tim K (Tim Kvasnosky). Their music was featured in a psychedelic national Friskies commercial that aired initially during the Winter Olympics of 2010.

== History ==
The band formed in 2009, composed of Tim K on keyboards and Deanne "Dede" Reynolds on vocals. The band's song "My Secret Sweet" was featured on the 1st episode of IFC's "Dinner with the Band" in April 2010.

The duo's "Adventureland" music, composed for Purina's Friskies, was featured as AdWeek magazine's Ad of the day.

An interview with Tim K featured in the April 2010 edition of 'Boards magazine.

DEDE is represented by notable Music Lawyer Elliot Resnik.

The member of DEDE, Tim K and Deanne Reynolds, joined forces with Waajeed to form group Tiny Hearts in 2011.

== Influences ==
The group's artist influences include Serge Gainsbourg, Françoise Hardy and Stereolab. Their musical influences are French Pop, combined with jazz funk, Baroque pop and 90's trip hop. Their sound often incorporates vintage electronic keyboards.

== Musical style ==
The band is labeled a "dream pop" and "poppy" band due to their nostalgic lyrics and 60's aesthetic, crunchy drums and haunting lyrics. Dede's music combines live drums recorded in a classic breakbeat manner with vintage organs (Farfisa and Vox organs) and other keyboards, overlaid with heavily effected unison female vocals and pop melodies.
