= Salted Music =

Salted Music logo

Salted Music is an American electronic dance music record label, based in San Francisco, California, founded by Miguel Migs.

== Artists ==
- Miguel Migs
- Lisa Shaw
- Julius Papp
- Deeplomatik (DJ Seb Skalski)
- Soledrifter
- Yogi & Husky

== Releases ==
- SLT100: The Deposit Box - Miguel Migs - Release Date: July 19, 2016
- SLT099: La Papaye – Lumoon & Rob!n - Release Date: June 17, 2016
- SLT098: I Wanna Dance – Deeplomatik - Release Date: May 13, 2016
- SLT097: I Can See It – Lisa Shaw - Release Date: April 22, 2016
- SLT096: The Flavor Saver EP Vol. 17 - Release Date: April 1, 2016
- SLT095: Call It Anything – Soledrifter - Release Date: March 11, 2016
- SLT094: Eyes For You – Miguel Migs feat. Martin Luther - Release Date: February 26, 2016
- SLT093: Everything in Between – Kinky Movement - Release Date: Feb 12, 2016
- SLT092: Soul Searching EP – Relative - Release Date: December 18, 2015
- SLT091: My Love My Sins EP – Sebb Junior - Release Date: November 20, 2015
- SLT090: Space Drop EP – Deeplomatik - Release Date: November 6, 2015
- SLT089: The Flavor Saver EP Vol 16 - Release Date: October 16, 2015
- SLT088: So Good – Miguel Migs - Release Date: August 7, 2015
- SLT087: Dimensions EP – Fabio Tosti - Release Date: July 17, 2015
- SLT086: The Beat Inside – Soledrifter - Release Date: May 19, 2015
- SLT085: The Flavor Saver EP Vol 15 - Release Date: April 21, 2015
- SLT084: The Melody – Miguel Migs - Release Date: April 7, 2015
- SLT083: The Way EP – Sebb Junior - Release Date: March 17, 2015
- SLT082: The Weapon is the Word – Kinky Movement - Release Date: February 24, 2015
- SLT081: Falling – Lisa Shaw - Release Date: February 10, 2015
- SLT080: The Flavor Saver EP Vol 14 - Release Date: December 16, 2014
- SLT079: Crossed Signals EP - Release Date: November 25, 2014
- SLT078: Feelings – Russ Jay feat. Natalie Wood - Release Date: November 4, 2014
- SLT077: Below the Surface EP – Demarkus Lewis Release Date October 7, 2014
- SLT076: Flavor Saver EP Vol 13 - Release date September 9, 2014
- SLT075: I Can Feel It – Miguel Migs - Release Date – August 12, 2014
- SLT074: The Next Drop EP – Deeplomatik - Release Date: May 27, 2014
- SLT065: Corrado Rizza presents Global Mind - In The Heat (Miguel Migs Remixes) - Release Date: July 2, 2013
- Miguel Migs - Dance and Clap
- Manuel Sahagun - Wake Me Up EP
- Miguel Migs - Tonight
- Miguel Migs - The Flavor Saver EP, Volume 9
- Miguel Migs - The System
- Lisa Shaw - Honey
- Miguel Migs - The Flavor Saver EP, Volume 8
- Miguel Migs - Close Your Eyes
- Jay West - Still Groovin' EP
- Miguel Migs - Outside the Skyline
- Christian Alvarez feat. Mr. V. - All Nations
- Miguel Migs - The Flavor Saver EP, Volume 7
- Miguel Migs feat. Evelyn "Champagne" King - Everybody
- Miguel Migs - Red & Dread
- Yogi & Husky - Bass, Drums, Harmony EP
- Jay West - The Restart EP
- Miguel Migs - The Flavor Saver EP, Volume 6
- Husky - The Soul Of Sydney EP
- Arco - Special Things EP
- Lisa Shaw - FREE EP
- Miguel Migs - The Flavor Saver EP, Volume 5
- Sonny Fodera - Into My Mind
- TNT Inc. vs. Alex Dimitri - Jingo
- Phonic Funk - The Northern Lights EP, Volume 2
- Justin Michael & Dave Mayer feat. Maiya - Lost In The Music
- Christian Alvarez feat. Jo'Leon Davenue - The Way
- Miguel Migs - The Flavor Saver EP, Volume 4
- Andrew Chibale - Mango Biche EP
- Lisa Shaw - Can You See Him
- Nathan G - Melbourne EP
- Frakensen and Tom Wax - Bodyworker EP
- Phonic Funk - The Northern Lights EP, Volume 1
- Fabio Tosti - Set Me Free EP
- Dutchican Soul - Get On Down
- Miguel Migs - Dubs and Rerubs
- Miguel Migs - Get Salted Volume 2
- Miguel Migs - The Flavor Saver EP Volume 3
- Lisa Shaw - Like I Want To
- Miguel Migs - The Flavor Saver EP Volume 2
- Yogi & Husky - Body Language EP
- Lisa Shaw - Free
- Miguel Migs - More Things EP
- Lisa Shaw - Music In You
- Joshua Heath - Writers Block EP
- Miguel Migs feat. Sadat X - Shake It Up
- Miguel Migs - The Flavor Saver EP Volume 2
- Sonny J Mason - Life Is The Music
- Miguel Migs - Those Things Remixed
- Lisa Shaw - All Night High
- Yogi & Husky - The Random Soul EP
- Miguel Migs - Let Me Be
- Joshua Heath - The Turning Tables EP
- Miguel Migs feat. Lisa Shaw - Those Things
- Miguel Migs - Those Things
- Miguel Migs - So Far
- Joshua Heath - The Coldcuts EP
- Miguel Migs - The Favor Saver EP Volume 1
- Chuck Love - Spread The Love
- Miguel Migs - Get Salted volume 1
- Li'Sha Project - Feel
- Chuck Love - Frozen in Minneapolis
- Roomsa feat. Lady Sarah - Sunris
- Kaskade - Safe
- Miguel Migs feat. Li'Sha - Do It For You
- Soledrifter - No Holding Back EP
- Sebb Aston- Feel Alright EP
