= Colorful You =

Studio album by Miguel Migs
- Released: 1 October 2002
- Genre: House; deep house; downtempo
- Length: 1:13:52
- Label: Astralwerks; Naked Music

Miguel Migs chronology
Colorful You (2002)	Those Things (2007)

Professional ratings
Review scores
Source	Rating
AllMusic	4/5 stars

Colorful You is Miguel Migs's (real name Miguel Steward) debut album, after working extensively on previous album projects for the Naked Music/Astralwerks label.

== Track listing ==
All tracks are written by Miguel Migs except where noted.

No.	Title	Length
1.	"Introseduction"	4:36
2.	"Brand New Day" (feat. LaGerald Normand)	5:20
3.	"Think It Over" (feat. Lisa Shaw)	4:55
4.	"The Night"	6:43
5.	"Waiting" (feat. Lisa Shaw)	4:46
6.	"Breakin' It Down"	6:24
7.	"Inspirational Interlude"	2:16
8.	"Days Of Color" (feat. Lisa Shaw)	6:34
9.	"Soul Vibe" (feat. LaGerald Normand)	6:31
10.	"Messages"	5:07
11.	"One Wish For You" (feat. Lisa Shaw)	5:16
12.	"Don't Let Me Down"	4:59
13.	"The One"	5:45
14.	"Surrender"	5:47

== Personnel ==
- Dave Boonshoft – executive producer
- Emily Lazar – mastering
- Miguel Migs – arranger, producer
- Stuart Patterson – art direction
- Bruno Ybarra – executive producer
