= Those Things =

Studio album by Miguel Migs
- Released: 20 March 2007
- Genre: Deep house; house
- Label: Salted Music

Miguel Migs chronology
Colorful You (2002)	Those Things (2007)	Outside the Skyline (2011)

Singles from Those Things
- 1. "So Far" Released: March 21, 2007; 2. "Mesmerized (UK Single)" Released: March 2007; 3. "Those Things" Released: May 15, 2007; 4. "Let Me Be" Released: November 1, 2007; 5. "Shake It Up" Released: November 12, 2008

Those Things is the second album by songwriter and music producer Miguel Migs, released in 2007. The album peaked at number 15 on the US Top Electronic Albums chart. It is an album that ranges from deep house to hip house, with each being solid productions overall. Those Things features vocal performances by Migs's main vocalist on his songs, Lisa Shaw, Aya, Tim Fuller, and reggae artist Junior Reid. The album features more live instrumentation than Migs' début album and includes a guest appearance by Fred Ross of Sly and the Family Stone. The lead single, "So Far", peaked at number six on the Hot Dance Club Play chart.

== Critical reception ==
Allmusic's Rick Anderson described the album as "a perfectly functional dance collection that achieves occasional greatness". Dave Hoffman of PopMatters described it as the "first great electronica album of 2007, showcasing an adventurous, world-class producer at the top of his game".

== Track listing ==
No.	Title	Length
1.	"So Far" (feat. Lysa Aya Trenier)	4:39
2.	"Make Things Happen" (feat. Lisa Shaw)	5:27
3.	"Can't Get Through" (feat. Tim Fuller)	5:19
4.	"Mesmerized" (feat. Lysa Aya Trenier)	5:45
5.	"Those Things" (feat. Lisa Shaw)	6:36
6.	"Sometime" (feat. Tim Fuller)	6:31
7.	"Get Down" (feat. Lysa Aya Trenier)	5:56
8.	"Let Me Be" (feat. Fred Ross)	4:48
9.	"Fire" (feat. Junior Reid)	4:37
10.	"Shake It Up" (feat. Sadat X & Lisa Shaw)	4:29
11.	"Body Never Lies" (feat. Tim Fuller)	5:41
12.	"Side To Side" (feat. Lisa Shaw)	4:08
13.	"Giving It All" (feat. Lysa Aya Trenier)	5:52

== Those Things Remixed ==
In 2008, a remix album of Those Things was released, titled, "Those Things Remixed". In some regions, "Those Things Remixed" was released as an additional disc alongside the standard edition of the album.

Those Things Remixed
No.	Title	Length
1.	"Sometime" (feat. Tim Fuller) (Crazy P. Superfunk Remix)	6:15
2.	"Those Things" (feat. Lisa Shaw) (Simon Grey Phase II Vocal)	5:51
3.	"Make Things Happen" (feat. Lisa Shaw) (Miguel Migs Stripped Down Vocal)	5:29
4.	"Giving It All" (feat. Lysa Aya Trenier) (Miguel Migs Dub Deluxe)	5:51
5.	"Fire" (feat. Junior Reid) (Faze Action Afrotronic Re-Rub)	6:11
6.	"So Far" (feat. Lysa Aya Trenier) Rasmus Faber's Farplane Radio Edit)	6:31
7.	"Let Me Be" (feat. Fred Ross) (Miguel Migs Salted Vocal)	5:31
8.	"Can't Get Through" (feat. Tim Fuller) (Mario Basinov Deep Vocal)	5:45
9.	"Mesmerized" (feat. Lysa Aya Trenier) (Alix Alvarez Sole Channel Vocal)	5:58
10.	"So Far" (feat. Lysa Aya Trenier) (Eric's Old School Revival Dub)	5:56
11.	"Side To Side" (feat. Lisa Shaw) (Migs Interlude)	1:18
12.	"Fire" (feat. Junior Reid) (Cottonbelly Remix)	5:37
13.	"Shake It Up" (feat. Sadat X & Lisa Shaw) (J-Boogie Mix)	4:23
14.	"Get Down" (feat. Lysa Aya Trenier) (Dolls Combers Spring Vocal)	5:12
