= Welcome the Stranger =

2018 film by Justin Kelly

- Digital release poster
- Directed by: Justin Kelly
- Written by: Justin Kelly
- Produced by: Jordan Yale Levine; Scott Levinson; Justin Kelly; Thor Bradwell; Gina Gammell; Riley Keough
- Starring: Abbey Lee; Caleb Landry Jones; Riley Keough
- Cinematography: Matt Klammer
- Edited by: Joshua Raymond Lee
- Music by: Tim Kvasnosky
- Production companies: Yale Productions; Top Block Productions; Digital Ignition Entertainment; Vineyard Point Productions
- Distributed by: Sony Pictures Home Entertainment
- Release date: March 20, 2018
- Running time: 94 minutes
- Country: United States
- Language: English

Welcome the Stranger is a 2018 American mystery thriller film written and directed by Justin Kelly, who also produced the film with Jordan Yale Levine, Scott Levinson, Thor Bradwell, Gina Gammell, and Riley Keough. It stars Abbey Lee, Caleb Landry Jones, and Keough.

== Plot ==
When Alice arrives unannounced at her estranged brother Ethan's house in an attempt to reconcile, bizarre visions and the return of Ethan's strange girlfriend, Misty, begin to spark paranoia and suspicion. As the haunting visions become more peculiar, the two siblings desperately cling to reality, but are forced to face the mysterious circumstances.

== Cast ==
- Abbey Lee as Alice
- Caleb Landry Jones as Ethan
- Riley Keough as Misty
- Rosemary Howard as Housekeeper
- John Clofine as Danny (Housekeeper's Son)

== Production ==
In July 2016, it was announced that Riley Keough, Caleb Landry Jones, and Abbey Lee had joined the cast of the film, with Justin Kelly writing, directing, and producing the film alongside Keough, Scott Levinson, Jordan Yale Levine, Thor Bradwell, and Gina Gammell under their Yale Productions and Digital Ignition Entertainment banners respectively.

=== Filming ===
Principal photography began in July 2016, in Kingston, New York.

== Release ==
The film was released through video on demand on March 20, 2018, by Sony Pictures Home Entertainment.
