= Cherry (Lisa Shaw album) =

Studio album by Lisa Shaw
- Released: October 25, 2005
- Genre: House; electronica; R&B; soul; dance; downtempo
- Length: 54:16
- Label: Naked Music; Astralwerks
- Producer: Jay Denes; Eric Stamile

Lisa Shaw chronology
Cherry (2005)	Free (2009)

Cherry is the solo debut album by Canadian singer Lisa Shaw, released in 2005 on Naked Music.

== Chart performance ==
The album debuted and peaked at number 20 on the Billboard Top Dance/Electronic Albums chart dated 12 November 2005. One of the album's singles, "Born to Fly," was also modestly successful, reaching number 25 on the Dance Singles Sales chart.

== Track listing ==
1. "Cherry" – 3:35
2. "Don't Know What to Do" – 3:13
3. "When I" – 4:51
4. "Grown Apart" – 3:36
5. "Push-Button" – 3:16
6. "Hot Skin" – 4:04
7. "Matter of Time" – 4:32
8. "Dim Light" – 1:55
9. "Always" – 4:02
10. "Born to Fly" – 3:59
11. "Stylin'" – 3:24
12. "It's Been Awhile" – 4:59
13. "The Last Time" – 4:22
14. "Let It Ride (Jimpster Remix)" – 4:26

== Personnel ==
- Dave Boonshoft – bass, executive producer
- Jay Denes – audio production, composer, keyboards, producer, programming
- Mark Anthony Jones – guitar
- Jennifer Karr – vocals (background)
- Emily Lazar – mastering
- Jamie Odell – keyboards, programming, remixing
- Ricardo Quinones – guitar
- Saul Rubin – guitar
- Lisa Shaw – composer, producer, vocals
- Bill Stair – logistics
- Eric Stamile – audio production, composer, keyboards, producer, programming
- Dave Warrin – composer, producer
