= The Devil Wears Prada (soundtrack) =

Soundtrack album by Various Artists
- Released: July 11, 2006
- Genre: Various
- Length: 54:13
- Labels: Warner Bros. WEA International

The soundtrack album for The Devil Wears Prada was released by Warner Brothers/WEA on July 11, 2006. It includes popular songs by U2 and Madonna, and work by Alanis Morissette and Jamiroquai, many of which were used for significant scenes in the film. The film also contains the Blackliquid Remix to DJ Colette's hit single, "Feelin' Hypnotized".

Rounding out the album is a suite of original music composed for the movie by Theodore Shapiro.

== Track listing ==
Standard edition
No.	Title	Artist(s)	Length
1.	"Vogue"	Madonna	5:19
2.	"Bittersweet Faith"	Bitter:Sweet	4:20
3.	"City of Blinding Lights"	U2	5:44
4.	"Seven Days in Sunny June"	Jamiroquai	4:00
5.	"Crazy (James Michael Mix)"	Alanis Morissette	3:38
6.	"Beautiful"	Moby	3:10
7.	"How Come"	Ray LaMontagne	4:28
8.	"Sleep"	Azure Ray	5:00
9.	"Feelin' Hypnotized (Blackliquid Remix)"	DJ Colette	4:55
10.	"Tres Tres Chic"	Mocean Worker	3:39
11.	"Here I Am (Kaskade Remix)" (featuring Tamra Keenan)	David Morales	3:38
12.	"Suite from The Devil Wears Prada"	Theodore Shapiro	6:24
Total length:			54:18

== The Devil Wears Prada Orchestral Oscar Edition ==
All score selections composed by Theodore Shapiro.

1. "She's On Her Way" - 02:00
2. "End Of The Interview" - 00:24
3. "Up And Down" - 00:39
4. "Go To Calvin Klein, Hermes And Others" - 01:01
5. "You're Already Late" - 01:06
6. "Intensive Week" - 01:25
7. "A Plane For Miranda" - 01:21
8. "She Hates Me, Nigel!" - 01:02
9. "The New Look Of Andrea" - 02:24
10. "James Holt's Collection" - 01:42
11. "The Book To My Home Tonight Andrea!" - 00:32
12. "In Miranda's House" - 02:03
13. "Andrea Goes Upstairs" - 00:48
14. "The Harry Potter Manuscript" - 02:07
15. "Meet You At The St. Regis" - 01:05
16. "That's All!" - 00:29
17. "The Gala Preparation" - 00:44
18. "You're... You're A Vision!" - 01:14
19. "Just For One Drink" - 01:14
20. "You Look Very Pretty" - 00:55
21. "Emily's Accident" - 01:16
22. "Is There Anything Else I Can Do?" - 01:28
23. "Christian And Andrea" - 01:17
24. "At The Hotel" - 00:34
25. "Andrea Finds The Mockup" - 01:14
26. "Andrea Can't Speak To Miranda" - 01:43
27. "The New President: Jacqueline Follet" - 02:48
28. "Miranda And Andrea" - 02:12
29. "Nate And Andrea" - 00:56
30. "You Must Have Done Something Right" - 01:02
31. "Go" - 03:14
32. "End Titles" - 01:58

== Songs featured in film but not included on soundtrack album ==
- "Blue at Couch" - Kenji Nakamura
- "Dance Floor (Le D Remix)" - The Tao of Groove
- "Every Angel" - The Push Stars
- "I Don't Love Anyone" - Belle & Sebastian
- "Jump" - Madonna
- "Les Yeux Ouverts (French cover of Dream a Little Dream of Me)" - The Beautiful South
- "Our Remains" - Bitter:Sweet
- "Suddenly I See" - KT Tunstall
- "Time Will Tell" - The Good Listeners
- "Vato Loco" - Latin Soul Syndicate
- "Yeah Yeah Brother" - Black Grape
- "All Kinds of Time" - Fountains of Wayne

== Credits ==
=== Technical ===
- Producer:
- Engineer: Chris Fogel
- Art director: Mathieu Bitton
- Orchestration: Pete Anthony, Jon Kull
- Mastering: Patricia Sullivan Fourstar

=== Performance ===
(On "Suite from The Devil Wears Prada")

- Contractors: Sandy DeCrescent, Peter Rotter
- Conductor: Pete Anthony
- Bass: Neil Stubenhaus
- Guitar: George Doering
- Drums: Greg Bissonette
- Percussion: Michael Fisher
