= Triple P (album) =

Studio album by Platinum Pied Pipers
- Released: May 10, 2005
- Genre: Hip hop, R&B
- Length: 54:22
- Label: Ubiquity Records
- Producer: Waajeed, Saadiq

Platinum Pied Pipers chronology
Triple P (2005)	Abundance (2009)

Singles from Triple P
- 1. "Stay With Me / I Got You / Your Day Is Done" Released: 2004; 2. "Act Like You Know" Released: 2005

Professional ratings
Review scores
Source	Rating
AllMusic	4/5 stars
Pitchfork Media	7.2/10
PopMatters	8/10 stars
Stylus Magazine	B+
XLR8R	favorable

Triple P is the first studio album by American hip hop and R&B group Platinum Pied Pipers. It was released on Ubiquity Records on May 10, 2005. "Act Like You Know" reached number 21 on the Hot Dance Singles Sales chart.

== Reception ==
Andy Kellman of AllMusic gave the album 4 stars out of 5, saying: "With help from a handful of MCs and vocalists, the producers/musicians cook up a varied array of hybridized backdrops that update 30 years of soul, hip-hop, and crossover jazz."

== Track listing ==
No.	Title	Length
1.	"Shotgun Intro" (featuring Jay Dee)	1:36
2.	"Your Day Is Done" (featuring Georgia Anne Muldrow)	3:28
3.	"Deep Inside" (featuring Sa-Ra Creative Partners)	4:40
4.	"Stay With Me" (featuring Tiombe Lockhart)	3:43
5.	"Fever" (featuring Zeno)	4:04
6.	"No Worries" (featuring Steve Spacek)	4:17
7.	"After the Worries"	1:21
8.	"Act Like You Know" (featuring Jay Dee)	2:50
9.	"Now or Never" (featuring Tiombe Lockhart)	2:54
10.	"The Pee's" (featuring Ta'Raach)	1:32
11.	"They Don't"	0:36
12.	"Lights Out" (featuring Ta'Raach and Georgia Anne Muldrow)	3:41
13.	"One Minute More" (featuring Georgia Anne Muldrow)	3:30
14.	"Detroit Winter" (featuring Invincible)	2:58
15.	"I Got You" (featuring Tiombe Lockhart)	4:46
16.	"50 Ways to Leave Your Lover" (featuring Rogier)	8:26
