= DJ Colette =

DJ and vocalist (born 1975)

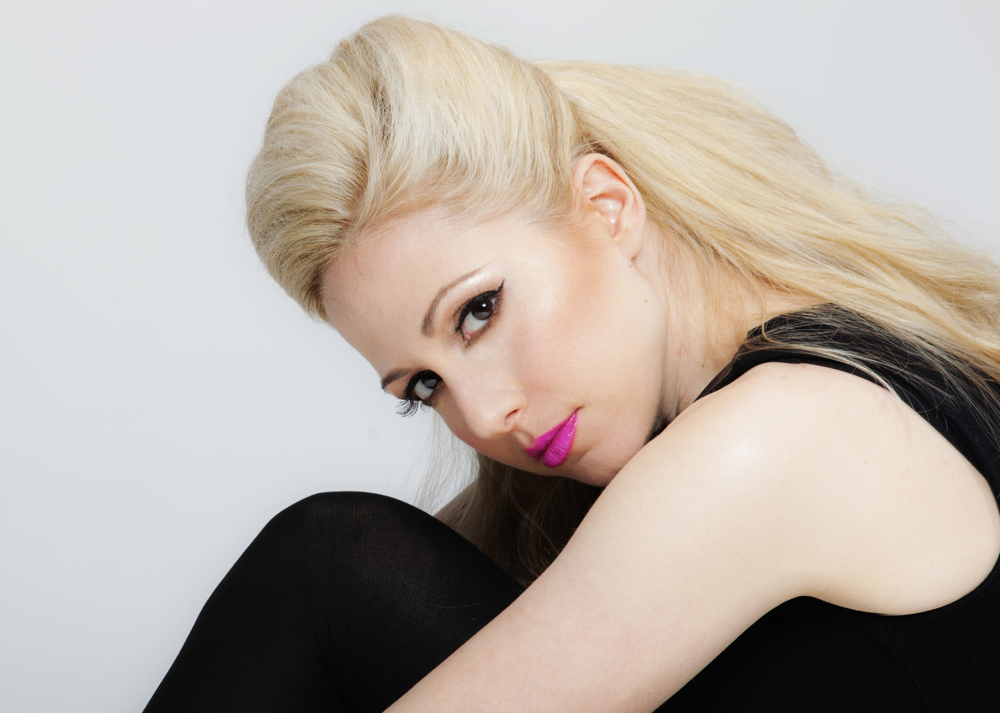
- Colette in 2013

Background information
- Also known as: Colette
- Born: Colette Marino; May 27, 1975 (age 51)
- Origin: Chicago, Illinois, U.S.
- Genre: House
- Occupations: DJ; singer; songwriter
- Years active: 1995–present
- Label: Om
- Website: www.djcolette.com
- Spouse: Thomas Ian Nicholas (m. 2007; sep. 2022)
- Children: 2

Colette Marino (born May 27, 1975), known professionally as DJ Colette or simply as Colette, is an American house music DJ, singer, and songwriter. She is a resident DJ at the SmartBar in Chicago, Illinois (along with Kaskade and others). She first gained attention when she started singing over her mixes as a DJ.

== Biography ==
Marino started DJing in the early 1990s. In 1997, she helped form the all-female DJ group SuperJane with DJ Heather, DJ Dayhota, and Lady D.

During the preparations for her album Push, she married actor/rock musician Thomas Ian Nicholas in 2007. They have two children, a son born in 2011, and a daughter, born in April 2016.

In 2003, Colette was chosen, along with Paul Van Dyk and Felix da Housecat, to advertise Motorola's cellular phones. Her song used in this commercial would go on to win Dancestar's "Best Song Used in a Commercial" for Motorola. She also received the "Best Breakthrough DJ" award.

Her album Hypnotized was the most downloaded dance album on Apple's iTunes Music Store in June 2005. Her song "What Will She Do for Love" from this album was a Billboard No. 1 Dance Club Play hit single. The title track, "Hypnotized", was licensed to the film The Devil Wears Prada for its soundtrack.

She hosted Lancaster, California radio station KVVS's show, Maximum Rotation.

Colette has performed across the globe. Notable cities include: Detroit, Michigan, Cambridge, Singapore, Calgary, Hollywood, Montreal, and Omaha.

Colette has been compared to Kylie Minogue and Deborah Harry. She has also been called Om Records' First Lady of House.

In 2013, she released her third album, When the Music's Loud, influenced by Italo disco and electro. The record received favorable reviews from Spin, Pitchfork and Slant. The album, which was recorded in Williamsburg, Brooklyn and Los Angeles featured the production of producer Tim K, who helped her develop the record with her over a three-year span. The record also featured the production of Santiago & Bushido, Nick Chacona and DJ Teenwolf. A studio tour in late 2012 revealed Colette recorded the vocals for the album on a Peluso P-12 and through a vintage recording chain. Sonically, the album made frequent use of vocoders and talk boxes. The album features a sample of Trax Records artist Adonis, on the second single "Hotwire". The album release date was August 27, 2013. The record was made entirely without live musical instruments.

In December 2013, Billboard included the album When the Music's Loud as one of the top 20 Dance Music Albums of 2013.

In May 2022, Colette filed for divorce from Thomas Ian Nicholas.

== Charting singles ==
Year	Title	Peak position Billboard Dance	Credit
2007	"If"	5	Colette Marino
2012	"What Will She Do for Love" (original mix)	28	Colette Marino
2012	"What Will She Do for Love" (Kaskade/A. Caldwell/Ken Mixes)	10	Colette Marino

== Discography ==
=== Albums ===
- Hypnotized (2005)
- Push (2007)
- When the Music's Loud (2013)
- Retrospective (2017)

=== Singles and EPs ===
- "Moments of Epiphany" (1995)
- "Keep On Groovin'" (1996)
- "Try Her for Love" (2000)
- "Find Your Love" (2000)
- "Innocent" (2001)
- "Sexuality" (2002)
- "Do You Want Me" (2002)
- "Keep It Down" (2004)
- "Our Day/Smile for Me" (2004)
- "Didn't Mean to Turn You On" (2005)
- "What Will She Do for Love" (2005)
- "Feelin' Hypnotized" (2005)
- "House of OM" (2006)
- "About Us" (2007)
- "If" (2007)
- "Stay" (2008)
- "Make Me Feel" (2009)
- "Think You Want It" (2009)
- "UR Everything" (2010)
- "Call On Me" (2010)
- "On a High" (2010)
- "Give Something" (2011)
- "Crush" (2012)
- "Crush 2" (2012)
- "Hotwire" (2013)
- "Physically" (2014)

=== Mix compilations ===
- In the Sun (2000)
- Our Day (2001)
- House of OM (2006)
