= King Cobra (2016 film) =

- Theatrical release poster
- Directed by: Justin Kelly
- Screenplay by: Justin Kelly
- Story by: Justin Kelly; D. Madison Savage
- Based on: Cobra Killer by Andrew E. Stoner; Peter A. Conway
- Produced by: James Franco; Vince Jolivette; Jordan Yale Levine; Scott Levenson; Shaun Sanghani; Iris Torres
- Starring: Garrett Clayton; Christian Slater; Alicia Silverstone; Molly Ringwald; Keegan Allen; James Franco
- Cinematography: Benjamin Loeb
- Edited by: Joshua Raymond Lee
- Music by: Tim Kvasnosky
- Production companies: Rabbit Bandini Productions; Yale Productions; SSS Entertainment
- Distributed by: IFC Midnight
- Release dates: April 16, 2016 (Tribeca Film Festival); October 21, 2016 (United States)
- Running time: 92 minutes
- Country: United States
- Language: English
- Box office: $81,757

King Cobra is a 2016 American biographical film about the life and early career of gay pornographic film actor Sean Paul Lockhart. It was directed by Justin Kelly and based on the book Cobra Killer: Gay Porn, Murder, and the Manhunt to Bring the Killers to Justice by Andrew E. Stoner and Peter A. Conway.

The film was released on October 21, 2016, by IFC Midnight.

== Plot ==
Seventeen-year-old Sean Paul Lockhart arrives in Pennsylvania to film a solo sex scene under the direction of Stephen Kocis, the owner of Cobra Videos. Sean lies to his mother, claiming that he is visiting Pennsylvania to intern with a film company, and also lies to Stephen about his age, saying he is eighteen. Sean chooses Brent Corrigan as his stage name, and after a successful first video agrees to stay on and continue filming gay pornography with partners, all under the direction of Stephen. Stephen, who is also housing Brent, becomes gradually infatuated with Brent, and they have sex despite Brent's reluctance.

Faded escort Joe Kerekes and his muse Harlow Cuadra run a competitor porn site called Viper Boyz. Joe is aggressively possessive of Harlow, and the couple are slipping into debt due to their extravagant lifestyle. Harlow becomes increasingly irate at the popularity of Brent.

Brent's videos become extremely popular, and upon learning how unfairly he is paid, Brent starts to feel animosity towards Stephen. He asks for a high fee for his next video, and although Stephen agrees to raise sightly, he reminds Brent that he is under contract. Later that evening, he discovers that Stephen has earned exorbitant amounts, and after a fight, Brent leaves to return home. After losing out on a high-profile contract due to Stephen legally owning his name, and after a telephone confrontation where Stephen tries to assert his position, Brent reports to the police that he was seventeen in the videos he filmed with Stephen. Stephen is indicted with child pornography charges and Brent's actions cause repercussions throughout the gay porn industry while rendering him unable to obtain work. It also causes friction with his mother, who looks upon him unfavorably.

Joe and Harlow offer Brent $25,000 to perform in a video with Viper Boyz, but grow agitated that Stephen retains ownership of the Brent Corrigan moniker. Harlow gains entry to Stephen's house by pretending to audition for Cobra Video, and during the audition, he violently stabs Stephen to death. He and Joe rob the house before burning it down in an attempt to make it look as though Stephen died from arson.

Quickly uncovered as foul play, Stephen's death launches a murder investigation. Brent goes to the police to disclose he believes Joe and Harlow were responsible. He visits their residence with a wire, and captures Harlow's confession to the killing. In the moments before their arrest, they consider the gravity of their crimes before reaffirming their love. At the police station, Brent reconciles with his mother. In the final shots, Brent is shown to be director and actor on set, producing porn with his own studio.

== Cast ==
- Garrett Clayton as Sean Paul Lockhart
- Christian Slater as Stephen Kocis
- Keegan Allen as Harlow Cuadra
- James Franco as Joseph "Joe" Kerekes
- Alicia Silverstone as Janette Lockhart
- Spencer Lofranco as Mikey
- Molly Ringwald as Amy Kocis
- Sean Grandillo as Caleb

== Release ==
King Cobra premiered at the 2016 Tribeca Film Festival in April 2016. Shortly after, IFC Films acquired distribution rights to the film. The film was released in the US on October 21, 2016.

== Reception ==
Rotten Tomatoes reports that 49% of 37 surveyed critics gave the film a positive review; the average rating is 5.6/10. Metacritic rated it 48/100 based on 19 reviews. Graham Fuller of Screen Daily wrote that it was "a movie of such wit and daring that it could transcend its LGBT appeal to become a crossover hit". David Ehrlich of IndieWire gave it a letter grade of B+ and described it as a "rock-solid dark comedy" with an excellent cast. Peter Debruge of Variety called it "all smut and no soul", comparing it to Cinemax After Dark. John DeFore of The Hollywood Reporter called it "a dreary would-be thriller" that has poor pacing.

Corrigan himself was approached about playing a supporting role in the film but declined. He later criticized the filmmakers for "bastardising" his life to present an inaccurate portrayal of the murder and of his time in pornography.
