= What a Night (Loveable Rogues song) =

Single by Loveable Rogues

from the album This and That
- Released: 19 April 2013
- Recorded: 2013
- Genre: Pop
- Length: 2:50
- Label: Syco
- Songwriters: Eddie Brett, Sonny Jay Muharrem, Te Eugene Qhairo, George Tizzard, Rick Parkhouse
- Producers: Red Triangle, Sonny J Mason

Loveable Rogues singles chronology
"What a Night" (2013)	"Honest" (2014)

"What a Night" is the debut single by British band Loveable Rogues, released in Ireland and the United Kingdom on 19 April 2013. The band were dropped from Syco in October 2013, but the single was featured on their debut album This and That, released in 2014 on Super Duper Records.

== Background ==
Loveable Rogues first announced that they're signed to Syco in June 2012. In late 2012, the band released a free mixtape through their SoundCloud channel. The collection of songs was released as a free download and was called First Things First. "What a Night" was previewed along with new songs such as "Maybe Baby", "Talking Monkeys" and "Honest".

== Music video ==
Two teaser videos were released before the music video. The first teaser video was uploaded to their Vevo channel on 11 February 2013. The second teaser released two days after or a week before the music video released; on 19 February 2013, the music video was uploaded to their Vevo channel. The video features the band having a night party with their friends.

== Chart performance ==
"What a Night" debuted on the UK Singles Chart at number 9 on 27 April 2013 after debuting at number 5 on the UK Singles Chart Update.

== Track listing ==
Digital download

1. "What a Night" - 2:50
2. "Nuthouse" - 3:58
3. "What a Night" (feat. Lucky Mason) (Sonny J Mason remix) - 3:41
4. "What a Night" (Supasound radio remix) - 2:42

== Charts ==
Chart (2013)	Peak position
Ireland (IRMA)	47
UK Singles (Official Charts)	9
