= Cubic Zirconia (band) =

American electronic dance music trio

- Origin: New York, United States
- Genres: House, R&B, neo-soul, electro-funk
- Years active: 2008–present
- Labels: Fool's Gold Records, Don't Cry Recordings
- Members: Tiombe Lockhart; Nick Hook; Daud Sturdivant
- Past members: Todd Weinstock
- Website: cubiczirconia.tumblr.com

Cubic Zirconia is an American electronic dance music trio from East Village, New York City composed of Tiombe Lockhart, Nick Hook and Daud Sturdivant. They have been noted for their energetic live performances and experimental sound, which combines elements from such genres as Chicago house music, neo-soul, rock and electro-funk.

== History ==
The group was formed in the fall of 2008, when Men, Women & Children keyboardist Nick Hook met singer Tiombe Lockhart at a sake bar he worked at. The pair became friends and decided to work on music together. They were joined by keyboardist/percussionist Daud Sturdivant, who worked at the same bar, and Hook's then-bandmate guitarist Todd Weinstock to form Cubic Zirconia. The first release from the group arrived on June 22, 2009, in the form of Fuck Work EP and featured the likes of Dâm-Funk, Dances with White Girls and Nacho Lovers remixing the title track. Later that year Weinstock left Cubic Zirconia to produce other artists as part of Social Security and play guitar in Hussle Club and Gina and The Eastern Block. The remaining members of the group spent late 2009 recording their debut album in Los Angeles. In 2010 Cubic Zirconia released singles "Josephine", "Black & Blue" and "Hoes Come Out at Night" on their own label Don't Cry Recordings, and announced that their debut full-length record, entitled Follow Your Heart would be released in February 2011 via LuckyMe Records. After a few months of release delays, Cubic Zirconia confirmed that they were now signed with Fool's Gold Records, who released the album on September 20, 2011.

== Members ==
=== Current members ===
- Tiombe Lockhart — vocals (since 2008)
- Nick Hook — keyboards, production (since 2008)
- Daud Sturdivant – keyboards, percussion (since 2008)

=== Touring members ===
- Justin Tyson – drums

=== Former members ===
- Todd Weinstock — guitar (2008–2009)

== Discography ==
=== Albums ===
- Follow Your Heart (2011, Fool's Gold Records)

=== EPs ===
- Fuck Work (2009) (Digital EP, The Savant Guard)
- Ready to Slide (2009) (free download)
- Darko (Remixes) (2012) (Digital EP, Fool's Gold Records)

=== Singles ===
- "Josephine" (2010) (Digital, Don't Cry Recordings)
- "Black & Blue" (2010) (Digital, Don't Cry Recordings)
- "Hoes Come Out at Night" (2010) (Digital, Don't Cry Recordings)
- "Hoes Come Out At Night (Ikonika Remix) / Reclash (Give It To Me) (feat. Bok Bok)" (2010) (12", Night Slugs)
- "Take Me High" (2011) (Digital, Fool's Gold Records)

=== Music videos ===
- "Fuck Work" (2009)
- "Josephine" (2010)
- "Black & Blue" (2010)
- "Hoes Come Out at Night" (2010)
- "Night or Day (feat. Bilal) (CZ Club Mix)" (2011)
- "Take Me High" (2011)
- "Take Me High (Bart B More Remix)" (2012)
- "Darko (Tommy Trash Remix)" (2012)

=== Remixes ===
- Apsci – Under Control (Cubic Zirconia Remix featuring Sammy Siegler) (2009)
- Egyptrixx – The Only Way Up (Cubic Zirconia Remix) (2010)
- Head Automatica – Can't Stand Amadeus (Cubic Zirconia Remix) (2010)
- Panteros666 – X Lova (Cubic Zirconia Remix) (2011)
- CHLLNGR – Ask For (Cubic Zirconia Remix) (2011)
- Greenmoney – Into You (feat. Roses Gabor) (Cubic Zirconia Remix) (2011)
- Yuksek – Off the Wall (Cubic Zirconia Remix) (2012)
