= Waajeed =

American rapper

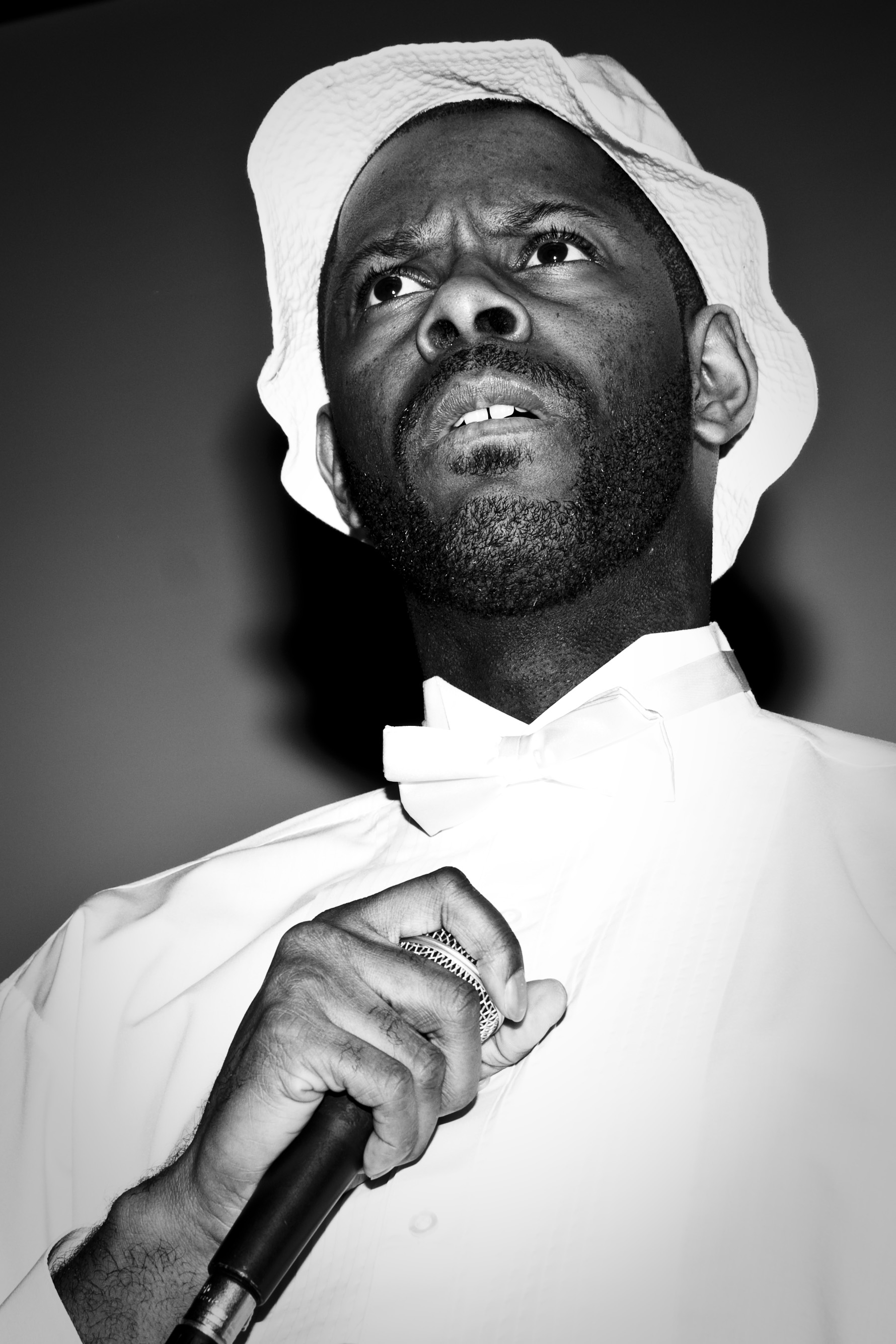
- Waajeed performing with PPP at Mighty in San Francisco, March 2009.

Background information
- Born: Robert O'Bryant IV; 1975 (age 50–51)
- Origin: Detroit, Michigan, U.S.
- Genres: Hip-Hop, Detroit Techno
- Occupation: Record producer
- Instruments: Keyboard; Sampler; Drum Machine
- Years active: 2000–present
- Labels: Bling47, Dirt Tech Reck
- Website: http://www.bling47.com

Robert O'Bryant IV (born 1975), also known as Waajeed is an American music producer from Detroit, and one half of the hip hop and R&B group Platinum Pied Pipers, and a founding member of Tiny Hearts. He formed the Bling47 record label in 2002, which has released projects by J Dilla, Waajeed himself, and others. Since 2013, he has preferred the name Jeedo.

== Biography ==
=== Background ===
Before producing records, Waajeed studied art and DJed in and around the Detroit music circuit. He was a photographer in the hip-hop scene and designed the cover for Slum Village's "Fan-Tas-Tic (Vol. 1)" and Fantastic, Vol. 2, among others.

Waajeed was an executive producer on Dwele's pre-debut project, Rize, which led to Dwele getting signed to Virgin Records. He has been a close friend of Slum Village, DJing for them and convincing the group to release their first album/demo, Fan-Tas-Tic (Vol. 1), choosing the group's name and introducing them to Elzhi.

Since his earlier records, Waajeed has shifted towards a "darker" sound which he explains in a 2013 interview. "People often ask me what my music is about and they see it as dark or bleak and yes, I do think it’s dark, but it’s also hopeful and optimistic. I make dark music to be a better person ... My music is dark because it’s a reflection of the times too. These are serious times we live in so even at its brightest moments there’s a taint to my work. What’s going on with all the gunplay – this is not a time for happy sing-along shit."

=== Career ===
As a producer, Waajeed began in 2000 and landed a handful of tracks on his longtime friends, Slum Village's Trinity (Past, Present and Future) album. Waajeed's productions have led to him working with some of the industry's most respected artists such as Cee Lo Green, John Legend, Mayer Hawthorne and more.

In 2007 he released an album called The War LP which included solo instrumentals as well as new production for Invincible, Tiombe Lockhart, TaRaach, and the late J Dilla. Waajeed has been a featured guest on radio shows including KCRW, BBC Radio 1, and more. In 2010, he released a preview of his remix of DEDE (American Band)'s "Phantom" on SoundCloud. In 2011, he joined and co-founded music group Tiny Hearts with producer Tim K and vocalist Dede Reynolds of DEDE. In 2012, he established his second independent label, Dirt Tech Reck.

== Discography ==
- B.P.M. – Waajeed (2002, Bling 47)
- Triple P – Platinum Pied Pipers (2005, Ubiquity)
- The War LP – Waajeed (2007, Fat City)
- Abundance – PPP (2009, Ubiquity)
- Memoirs of Hi-Tech Jazz – Waajeed (2022, Tresor)
