= Pretty Thing (film) =

- Release poster
- Directed by: Justin Kelly
- Written by: Jack Donnelly
- Produced by: Jordan Yale Levine; Jordan Beckerman; Jesse Korman; Scott Levenson; Lexi Tannenholtz
- Starring: Alicia Silverstone; Karl Glusman; Tammy Blanchard; Catherine Curtin
- Cinematography: Matt Klammer
- Edited by: Justin Kelly
- Music by: Tim Kvasnosky
- Production company: Yale Productions
- Distributed by: Shout! Studios
- Release date: July 4, 2025
- Running time: 96 minutes
- Country: United States
- Language: English
- Box office: $95,407

Pretty Thing is a 2025 American erotic thriller film directed by Justin Kelly, written by Jack Donnelly, and starring Alicia Silverstone, Karl Glusman, Tammy Blanchard, and Catherine Curtin.

== Cast ==
- Alicia Silverstone as Sophie
- Karl Glusman as Elliot
- Tammy Blanchard as Amanda
- Catherine Curtin as Peggy

== Production ==
In October 2023, it was announced that principal photography for the film, then titled The Bird and the Bee, had wrapped. Filming occurred during the 2023 SAG-AFTRA strike and SAG-AFTRA granted the filmmakers an interim agreement to allow principal photography to occur during the strike.

== Release ==
In March 2025, Shout! Studios acquired the North American distribution rights to the film, which was retitled Pretty Thing. The film was given a very limited theatrical release, along with its primary video on demand release, on July 4, 2025.

== Reception ==
=== Box office ===
With a very limited theatrical release, Pretty Thing grossed US$95,407.

=== Critical response ===
On the review aggregator website Rotten Tomatoes, 47% of 19 critics' reviews are positive.
