= Dinner with the Band =

- Genre: Food Reality
- Created by: Darin Bresnitz
- Developed by: Darin Bresnitz
- Directed by: Darin Bresnitz
- Presented by: Sam Mason
- Country of origin: United States
- Original language: English
- No. of seasons: 2
- No. of episodes: 16

Production
- Producers: Darin and Greg Bresnitz
- Production locations: Brooklyn, NY
- Editor: Erik Horn
- Camera setup: Multi-camera

Original release
- Network: IFC
- Release: November 24, 2009 – present

Dinner With The Band is an American food reality show hosted by chef Sam Mason. It began as an ON Networks web series in March 2007 but was later acquired by the Independent Film Channel and premiered as a full-length 30-min television show on November 24, 2009.

== The premise ==
In each episode, Mason invites a band into a Brooklyn loft doubling as a kitchen/small concert studio space. The band joins him in the kitchen as he creates an original meal in their honor such as Sharon Steaks and The Dap Rings for Sharon Jones & The Dap-Kings or Les Savy Pheasant for Les Savy Fav. In addition to the meal, Mason also prepares cocktails inspired by the band during the show. Typically, the featured band will perform two songs in between kitchen sessions and banter with Mason about their music and experience with food throughout the show.

== The host ==
Sam Mason is a Brooklyn-based chef who attended culinary school at Johnson & Wales University. Before becoming the host of Dinner With The Band, Mason worked under such famous chefs as Wylie Dufresne and Jean Louis Palladin. He has appeared in an episode of Iron Chef America, losing in a skirt steak battle against Iron Chef Masaharu Morimoto. His latest restaurant gig before Dinner With The Band was as chef/owner at Tailor in New York City, a position he left in late 2009.

Mason does not play an instrument himself though he has moonlighted as a country music DJ for East Village Radio. In an interview with The New York Times, Mason said that he was originally asked by the show's creators (Darin and Greg Bresnitz) to host despite the fact that they didn't know who he was. "No joke: they Googled ‘tattooed hipster chef’, and I came up."

== Guest bands ==
- Sharon Jones & The Dap-Kings
- Les Savy Fav
- Rufus Wainwright
- MEN
- The Mountain Goats
- YACHT
- Kid Sister and Flosstradamus
- The Devil Makes Three
- The Murder City Devils
- VEGA
- My Brightest Diamond
- Au Revoir Simone
- Andrew WK
- Lightspeed Champion
- Final Fantasy
