= Justin Kelly (director) =

American film director, screenwriter and editor

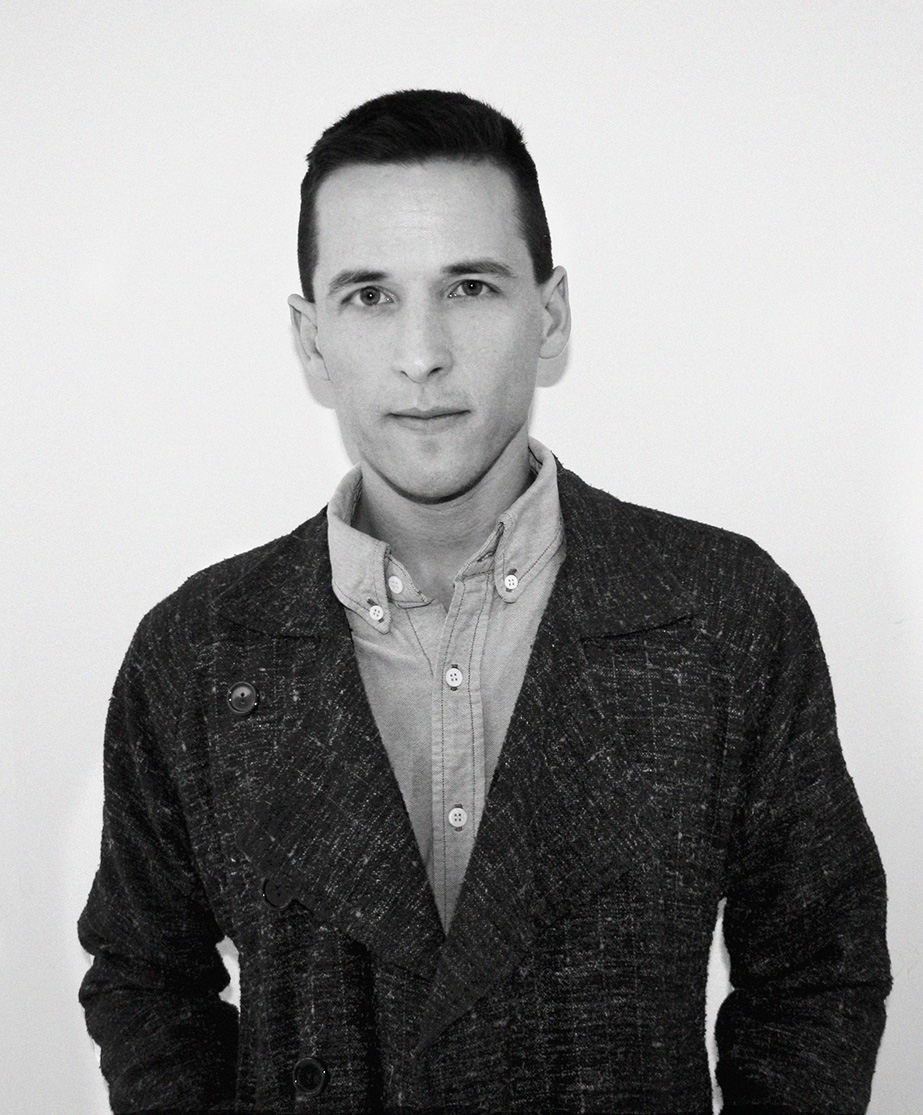
- Occupations: Director, screenwriter, editor

Justin Kelly is an American film director, screenwriter and film editor. He came to prominence as director and writer of Sundance Film Festival 2015 select I Am Michael, starring James Franco and Zachary Quinto. He then wrote and directed King Cobra, which premiered at the 2016 Tribeca Film Festival starring Christian Slater and James Franco, followed by Sony Pictures 2018 release Welcome the Stranger starring Riley Keough and Caleb Landry Jones, and most recently JT LeRoy (2018) starring Kristen Stewart and Laura Dern.

== Career ==
After a stream of directing short films as well as directing and editing music videos for artists such as Gossip, Hunx and his Punx and Tiny Hearts, Kelly worked as an editor before making the transition to feature film writer-director. Under the wing of film legend Gus Van Sant, he began shooting his first feature-length film I Am Michael in summer of 2014. Starring actors James Franco, Emma Roberts, Zachary Quinto and Charlie Carver, the controversial film's premiere was announced as a premiere select at the 2015 Sundance Film Festival. It was released theatrically January 27, 2017.

Kelly's second feature-length film, King Cobra, starring James Franco and Christian Slater, shot in the fall of 2015 and premiered at the 2016 Tribeca Film Festival. It was released theatrically via IFC Films on October 21, 2016. His third film Welcome the Stranger starring Abbey Lee, Riley Keough and Caleb Landry Jones, shot in the summer of 2016 and was released via Sony Pictures on March 13, 2018. Kelly's fourth feature-length film, JT LeRoy, based on the lives of Savannah Knoop and Laura Albert, a.k.a. JT LeRoy, and starring Kristen Stewart and Laura Dern, had its world premiere as the closing night film of the 2018 Toronto International Film Festival. It was released April 26, 2019, by Universal Pictures.

== Filmography ==
Short films

| Year | Title | Director | Writer | Editor |
|---|---|---|---|---|
| 2007 | Front | Yes | Yes | Yes |
| 2006 | Debris | Yes | Yes | Yes |
| 2009 | Girl | Yes | Yes | Yes |

Music videos

| Year | Artist | Title | Director | Editor |
|---|---|---|---|---|
| 2009 | Gossip | "Men In Love" | Yes | Yes |
| 2014 | Tiny Hearts | "Stay" | Yes | Yes |

Feature films

| Year | Title | Director | Writer |
|---|---|---|---|
| 2015 | I Am Michael | Yes | Yes |
| 2016 | King Cobra | Yes | Yes |
| 2018 | Welcome the Stranger | Yes | Yes |
| 2018 | JT LeRoy | Yes | Yes |
| 2025 | Pretty Thing | Yes | No |
