= Tiombe Lockhart =

American singer-songwriter

- Origin: Atlanta, Georgia, United States
- Genres: R&B, neo soul
- Occupation(s): Singer-songwriter, producer
- Years active: 2000–present
- Labels: Octave, Giant Step Records

Tiombe Lockhart is an American singer-songwriter from Atlanta, Georgia. She is a former member of Cubic Zirconia.

== Early life ==
Lockhart was born in Atlanta, Georgia. At the age of 12 she moved to Los Angeles and completed the Los Angeles County High School for the Arts. In 1997 she settled in New York City where she graduated from the New School University with the Bachelor of Fine Arts in Vocal Jazz Performance diploma.

== Career ==
In the early 2000s she performed at various East Coast venues, often as a support for Bilal. After collaborating with MCs from the Living Legends group (The Grouch, Eligh and Scarub), she began co-operating with the Platinum Pied Pipers. Tiombe was featured on three songs from the group's Triple P album, which attracted positive reviews and press coverage. The collaboration continued during the group's promotional tour and as a result Tiombe was given an offer to record her debut album on the Bling 47 label, formed by Waajeed of the Platinum Pied Pipers. In 2008 she formed the avantgarde electro-funk group Cubic Zirconia with Nick Hook and Daud Sturdivant. They released their debut album, Follow Your Heart, on September 20, 2011.

== Discography ==
Albums

- She Has Risen (2018)

Compilations

- The Aquarius Years (2020)

Unofficial albums

- The Tiombe Lockhart Bootleg #1 (2005)
- Tiombe Lockhart #1 (2007)

EPs

- Queen of Doom (2007)

Singles

- "Mr. Johnnie Walker" (2005)

Guest appearances

- Scarub and Very – "Black Beans and Dirty Rice" from Afro Classics? (2002)
- The Grouch & Eligh – "Atlantis" from No More Greener Grasses (2003)
- The Saint – "All You'll Be" from Grown Folk Music (2004)
- Platinum Pied Pipers – "Stay with Me", "Now or Never", and "I Got You" from Triple P (2005)
- Afro Classics – "Pleasure Island" from Classic Rock (2009)
- AC & Dell – "Jumping" from Right Now (2010)
- Blu – "Annie Hall" from York (2013)
- Dag Savage – "Cali Dreamin" from E&J (2014)
