= Outside the Skyline =

Studio album by Miguel Migs
- Released: September 20, 2011
- Genre: House; deep house
- Label: Om Records, Salted Music
- Producer: Miguel Migs

Miguel Migs chronology
| Those Things (2007) | Outside the Skyline (2011) | Dim Division (2014) |

Singles from Outside the Skyline
- 1. "Everybody" Released: July 19, 2011; 2. "Close Your Eyes" Released: October 25, 2011; 3. "The System" Released: January 24, 2012; 4. "Tonight" Released: May 15, 2012

Outside the Skyline is the third studio album by songwriter and music producer Miguel Migs, released September 20, 2011 on Om Records. Outside the Skyline features vocal performances by Migs's main vocalist, Lisa Shaw, as well as Aya, disco legend Evelyn "Champagne" King, reggae artists Capleton, Half Pint and Freddie McGregor, with Meshell Ndegeocello, Berlin-based singer Georg Levin, and bossa nova artist Bebel Gilberto. The first single, "Everybody", featuring Evelyn "Champagne" King, was released on 19 July 2011.

== Track listing ==
| No. | Title | Featured vocalist | Length |
|---|---|---|---|
| 1. | "Intro - Life" | Half Pint | 4:25 |
| 2. | "Tonight" | Meshell Ndegeocello | 4:28 |
| 3. | "Breakdown" | Lisa Shaw | 4:46 |
| 4. | "Everybody" | Evelyn "Champagne" King | 5:18 |
| 5. | "The Distance" | Aya | 5:11 |
| 6. | "Life" | Half Pint | 4:42 |
| 7. | "Close Your Eyes" | Meshell Ndegeocello | 4:49 |
| 8. | "They Don't Know" | Freddie McGregor | 4:45 |
| 9. | "The System" | Capleton | 4:48 |
| 10. | "Zuzu" | Bebel Gilberto | 4:17 |
| 11. | "Changin'" | Sonny J. Mason | 5:22 |
| 12. | "Don't Stop" | Aya | 4:14 |
| 13. | "Lose Control" | Lisa Shaw | 5:23 |
| 14. | "Getaway" | Georg Levin | 5:41 |
