= Karl Glusman =

American actor (born 1988)

- Born: January 3, 1988 (age 38); New York City, U.S.
- Education: Lake Oswego High School
- Occupation: Actor
- Years active: 2008–present
- Spouse: Zoë Kravitz (m. 2019; div. 2021)

Karl Glusman (born January 3, 1988) is an American actor. He had a lead role in Gaspar Noé's controversial drama Love (2015) and appeared in The Neon Demon (2016) and Nocturnal Animals (2016).

== Early life ==
Glusman was born in The Bronx, New York City. His family moved to the Portland, Oregon area when he was six months old. His father is of German Jewish descent and his mother is of Irish Catholic ancestry. He attended Lake Oswego High School and then enrolled at Portland State University, but dropped out after a year. Aspiring to be an actor, he took acting courses while in college and at the Portland Actors Conservatory. He later attended the William Esper Studio in New York City.

== Career ==
After shooting a television commercial for Adidas, Glusman relocated to France, where Argentine-French film director Gaspar Noé cast him in Love, a film depicting extensive unsimulated sex. It debuted at the 2015 Cannes Film Festival. The premiere set a record for the festival, selling all 2,200 seats in the Palais des Festivals et des Congrès. In Cannes, Glusman met film director and fashion designer Tom Ford, who cast him in Nocturnal Animals (2016). Also in 2016, Glusman appeared in Nicolas Winding Refn's thriller The Neon Demon. In 2020, he appeared alongside Tom Hanks in Aaron Schneider's Greyhound.

== Personal life ==
In 2016, Glusman began a relationship with actress Zoë Kravitz. Kravitz revealed in an interview published in October 2018 that she had become engaged in February of that year. They were married June 29, 2019, at the Paris, France, home of Kravitz's father, musician Lenny Kravitz. Kravitz filed for divorce on December 23, 2020, after 18 months of marriage. The divorce was finalized in August 2021.

== Filmography ==
=== Film ===
Year	Title	Role	Notes
2008	The Iconographer	Young thug	
2012	Starship Troopers: Invasion	Gunfodder	Voice role
2015	Ratter	Brent	
2015	Stonewall	Joe Altman	
2015	Love	Murphy	
2015	Embers	Chaos	
2016	The Neon Demon	Dean	
2016	Nocturnal Animals	Lou	
2019	Wounds	Jeffrey	
2019	Lux Æterna	Karl	
2019	Above Suspicion	Joe-Bea	
2020	Greyhound	Eppstein	
2022	Watcher	Francis	
2022	Please Baby Please	Teddy	
2023	God Is a Bullet	Cyrus	
2023	The Bikeriders	Corky	
2023	Reptile	Sam Gifford	
2024	Junk	Grady	
2024	Civil War	Spotter	
2025	Pretty Thing	Elliott	
2025	Eenie Meanie	John	
2025	The Running Man	Frank	
2026	The Basics of Philosophy	Baruch Spinoza	

=== Television ===
Year	Title	Role	Notes
2011	No. 6	Yoming (voice)	6 episodes; English version
2017	Gypsy	Sam Duffy	10 episodes
2020	Devs	Sergei	Miniseries; 4 episodes
2023	The Idol	Rob	2 episodes
