= Loveable Rogues =

British band

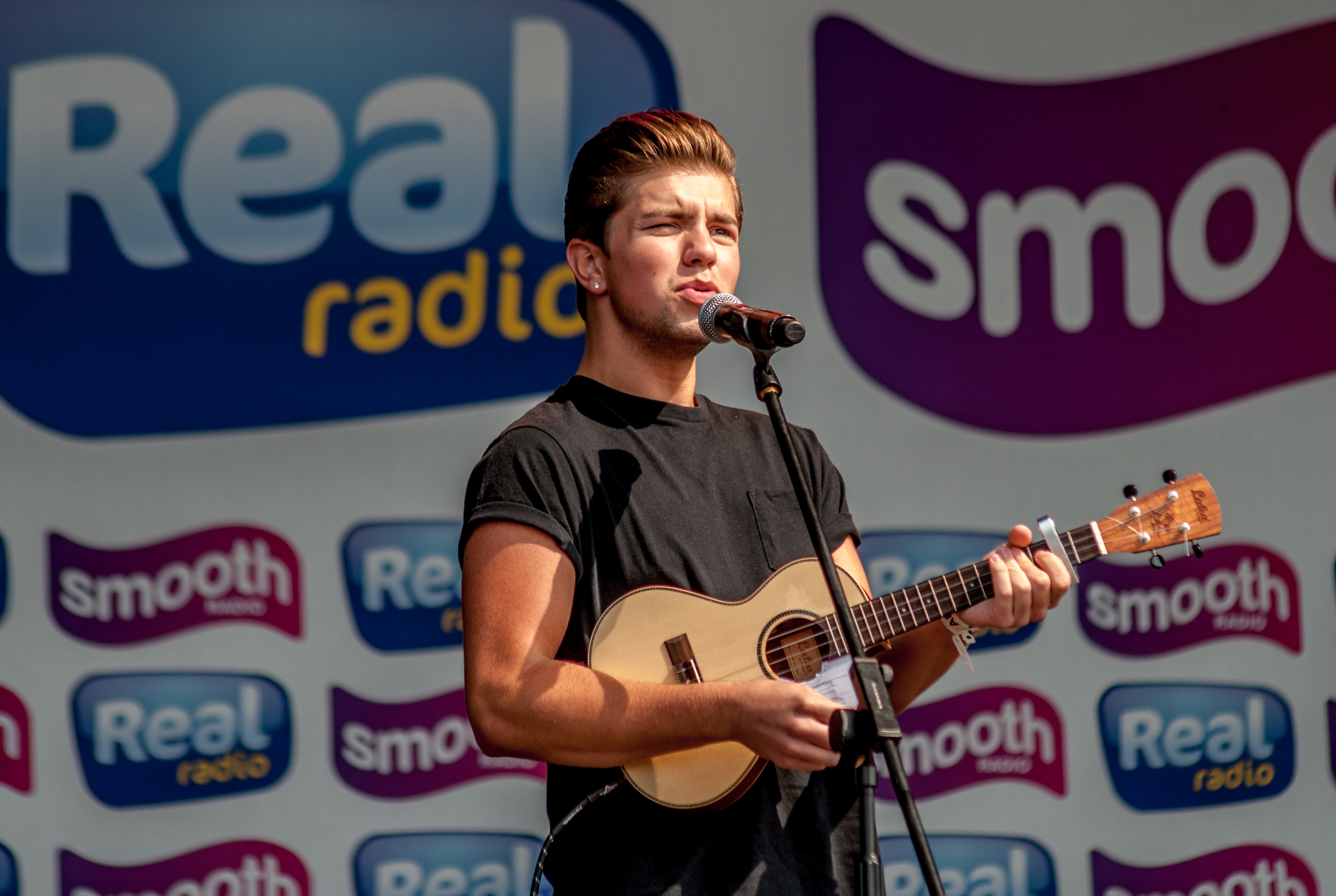
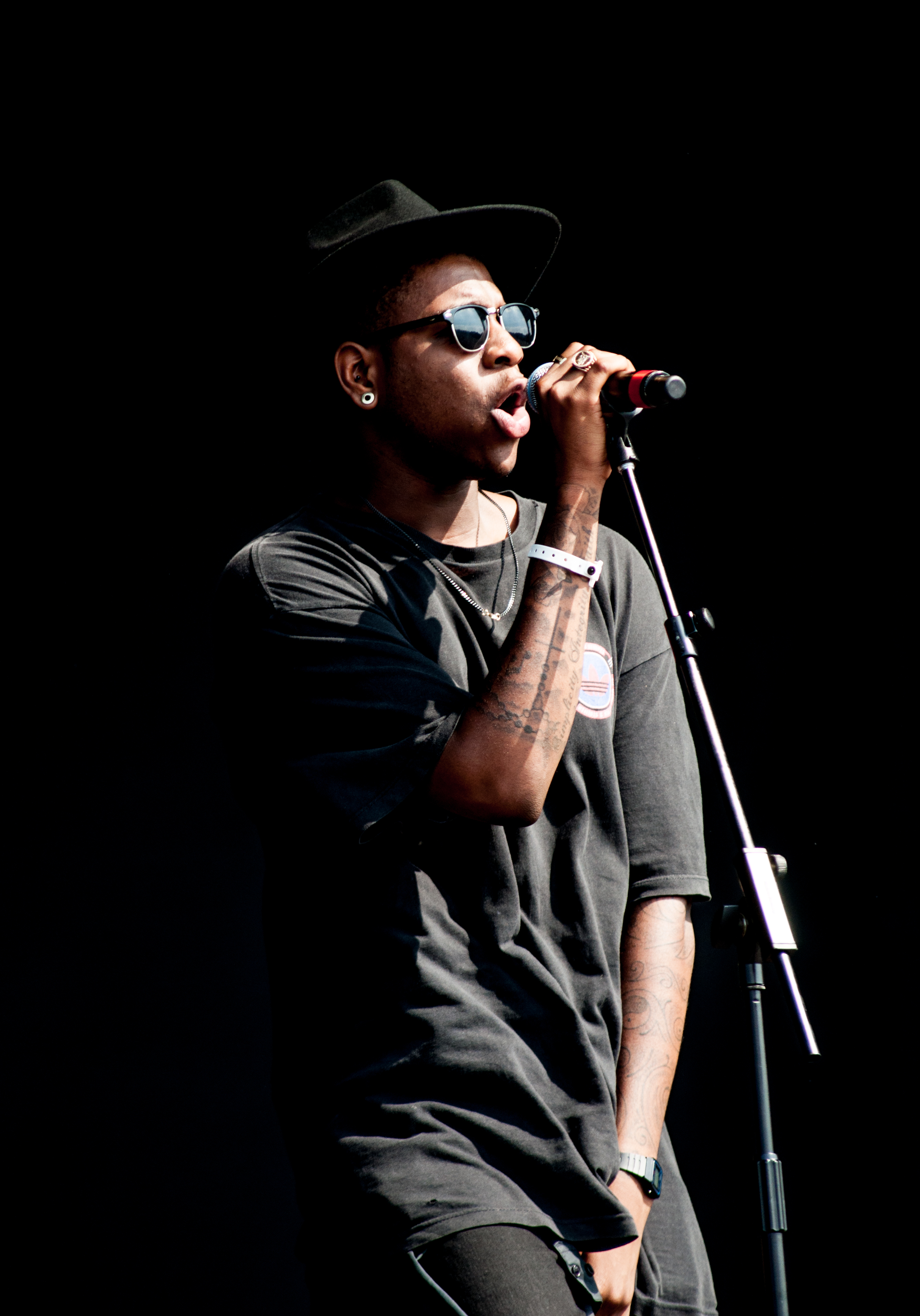
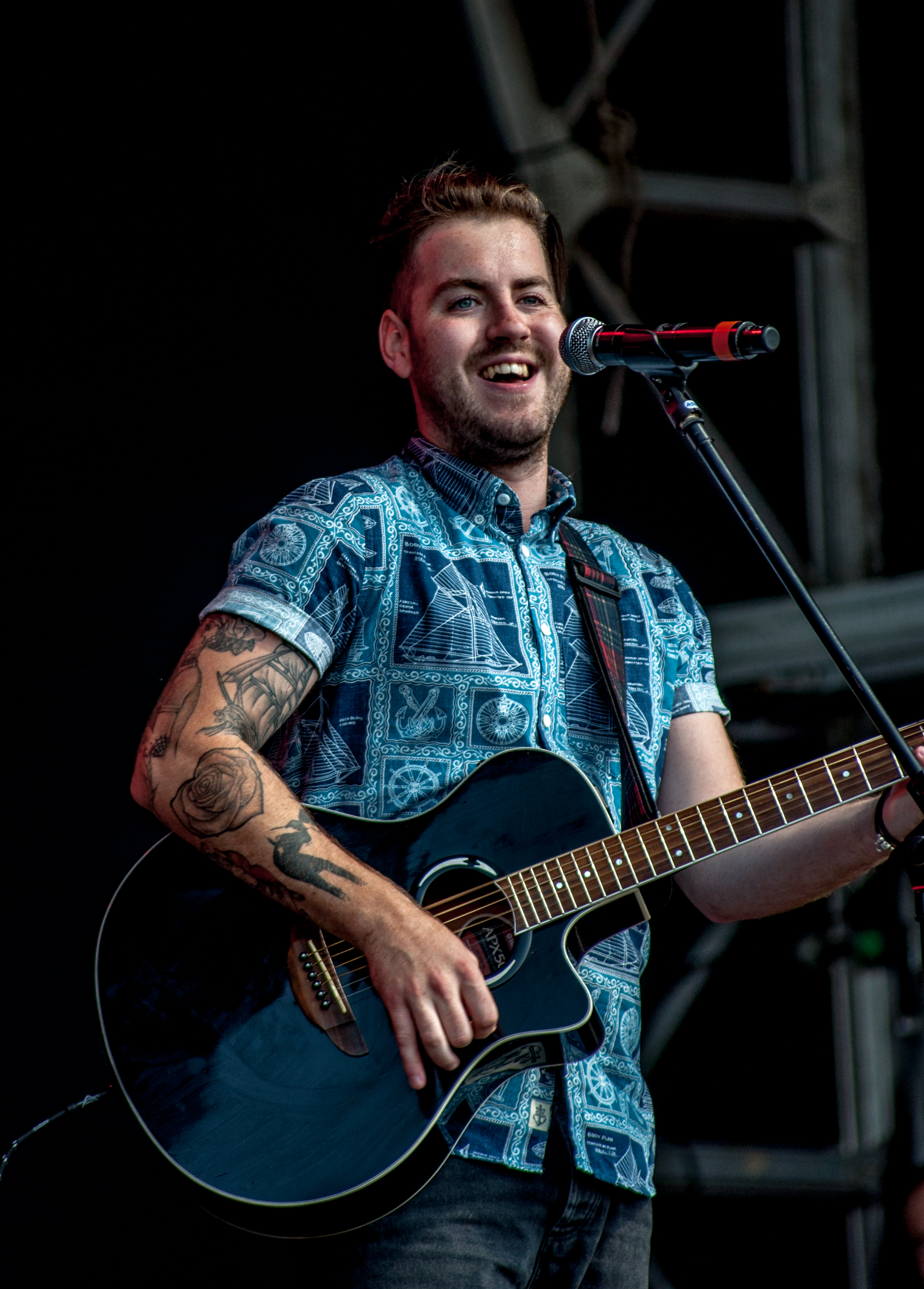
- /

Background information
- Origin: Chingford, London, England
- Genres: Indie pop
- Years active: 2010–2014
- Label: Syco
- Past members: Sonny Jay; Eddie Brett; Te Eugene Qhairo
- Website: Official website

The Loveable Rogues were a British band from London, consisting of members Sonny Jay, Eddie Brett and Te Qhairo Eugene, who rose to fame after reaching the final of the sixth series of Britain's Got Talent in 2012.

== Career ==
=== 2010–12: Britain's Got Talent ===
In 2012, The Loveable Rogues were asked by Britain's Got Talent producers to audition for the show. They performed two of their original compositions on the show, "Lovesick" and "Honest", both which were positively received by fans and the judges alike and were written by the three boys themselves. They had a fanbase before appearing on the show. They finished in fourth place with 5.7% of the final vote, behind the winners Ashleigh and Pudsey, and runners-up Jonathan & Charlotte and Only Boys Aloud.

==== 2012–13: Record deal and First Things First ====
On 12 June 2012, they informed fans to check the papers of tomorrow for 'good news!'. This turned out to be the fact that the band had been signed to record label Syco Music.

In late 2012, the band released a free mixtape through their SoundCloud channel. The collection of songs was released as a free download and was called 'First Things First'. Their debut single, "What A Night" was previewed along with new songs such as "Maybe Baby", "Talking Monkeys" and "Honest". Covers were also on the mixtape, including their version of "Charmless Man" and "I Wanna Be The Only One".

On 19 February 2013, they released the video for their debut single "What a Night". The song was released on 21 April 2013.

=== 2012–13: Olly Murs support ===
In November 2012, the Loveable Rogues were confirmed as the support act for Olly Murs' 2013 Right Place Right Time arena nationwide tour. The tour included playing two sold-out hometown shows at London's The O2 Arena.

The Setlist is

1 Talking Monkeys 2 Honest 3 Lovesick 4 Sweet Lovin' 5 What a Night

=== 2013–14: Drop from record label ===
On 18 October 2013, it was announced that the band had been dropped by their record label Syco Music.

==== 2014: After Syco ====
After being dropped by Syco Music the band teamed up with Alex Katter of Gravity MGMT and announced they will be releasing an EP entitled 'Honest' in May, followed by their debut album 'This & That' on 18 August. The boys finished their first ever headline tour 'The Talking Monkeys Tour' in March 2014 travelling across the UK to perform at different venues for their fans. Their second headline tour is called 'This & That'. The tour is scheduled for November 2014.

The album This & That went straight into #37 on the UK Albums Chart with a high position of #6 on the iTunes chart.

Track Listing for 'This & That'

1. Sweet Lovin' 2. Talking Monkeys 3. What A Night 4. Honest 5. Love Sick 6. Story About Me 7. Someone You're Not 8. Everything's Better With You 9. This and That 10. Front Story 11. Nuthouse 12. Mr. Piano Man

=== 2014–15: Split and life after ===
The Loveable Rogues announced that after their 'This & That Tour' in November, they will be parting ways. "To all our fans and followers – and anyone else who has dipped into our adventure over the past five years – we have some news," they said in a statement.

"The three of us, who you'll know as the Loveable Rogues, have made the tough, but self-assured decision to part ways at the end of the year.”

"We've had the most incredible time as a band - writing, performing, touring and playing together for half a decade - but the time feels right to head in different directions and take on new endeavours."

They continued: "We were delighted to finally release our debut album this year, and the response and love for it was incredible, so thank you again to everyone who remained patient and bought it. It made the endurance worthwhile.

=== Post-band projects ===
Sonny Jay Muharrem joined Brentwood radio station Phoenix FM as a presenter in June 2015. His show "Sonny Jay's Phoenix Nights" can be heard on Friday nights from 10 pm to midnight. In 2016, Sonny joined Capital FM to present Thursday and Friday overnights. After just a year, he joined Capital Breakfast with Roman Kemp and Vick Hope (later Sian Welby) and in 2022, he left Capital Breakfast to present The Capital Late Show Every Weekdays. Sonny won the thirteenth series of Dancing on Ice in March 2021.

== Discography ==
=== Studio albums ===
Title	Album details	Peak chart positions
Title	Album details	UK
This and That	Release date: 11 August 2014; Label: Super Duper; Format: Digital download, CD	37

=== Singles ===
Year	Song	Peak chart positions			Album
Year	Song	UK	IRE	SCO	Album
2013	"What a Night"	9	47	12	This and That
2014	Honest (EP)	58	-	*	This and That

- Honest charted on the UK Singles Chart as, under UK chart rules, EPs under a certain length are categorised as singles and are considered for inclusion in the singles chart instead of the albums chart.
