= Platinum Pied Pipers =

Music group

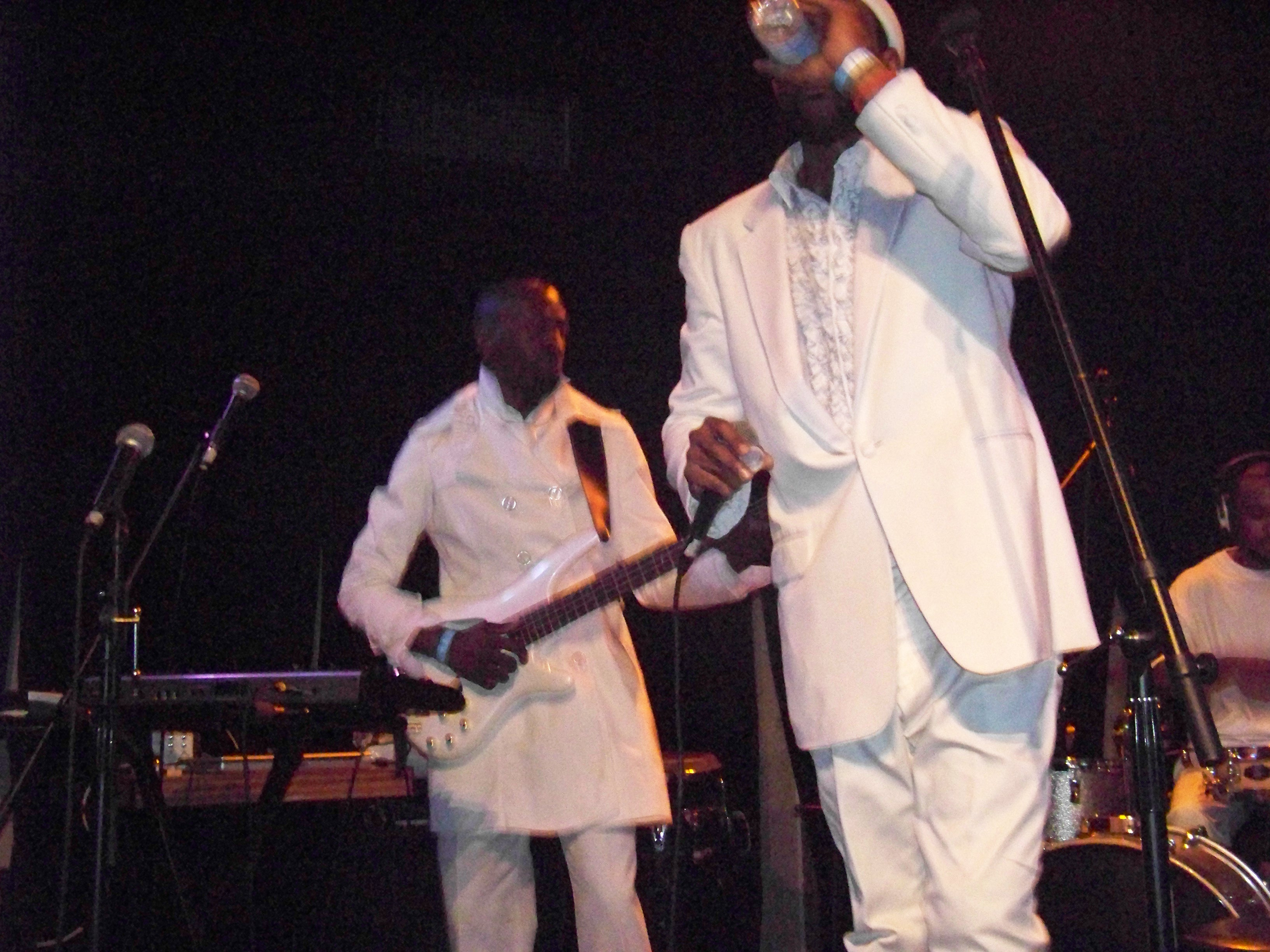
- Platinum Pied Pipers performing in Atlanta, Georgia in 2008

Background information
- Origin: Detroit, United States
- Genres: Hip hop, R&B
- Years active: 2000–present
- Label: Ubiquity Records
- Members: Robert "Waajeed" O'Bryant; Darnell "Saadiq" Bolden
- Website: http://www.ubiquityrecords.com

Platinum Pied Pipers is a Detroit-based hip hop and R&B group composed of producer Waajeed (Robert O'Bryant), and multi-instrumentalist Saadiq (Darnell Bolden). Their music usually features a rotating and varied array of artists.

== Background ==
The two met through rapper Baatin in 1992. Sometime in 2000, they decided to form a duo and began releasing 12"s and mixtapes. It was their collaboration with Dwele in 2003, however, called "Ridin' High" which caught the ears of music listeners, and set the stage for a full-length album. The pair have a rather distinctive mixture of sounds as, although Waajeed is primarily a hip hop producer, Saadiq is a protégé of Motown producer Barrett Strong, making for a finely tuned middleground. As stated in interviews, the name "Platinum Pied Pipers" was chosen at random and has no connection to the Pied Piper folk tale. Since Detroit is their hometown, they have said that the city is very important to them.

Their debut album Triple P was released in 2005 on Ubiquity Records. Their second album Abundance was released January 20, 2009. Wajeed stated: "...our tastes have changed—times have changed. It’s definitely a different record, but there are still a lot of similarities."

== Discography ==
=== Albums ===
- Triple P - (2005, Ubiquity)
- Abundance - (2009, Ubiquity)

=== 12"s ===
- "Ridin' High" b/w "Open Your Eyes" - (2003, Ubiquity Records)
  - featuring Dwele
- "Stay With Me"*, "I Got You"*, "Your Day Is Done"^ - (2004, Ubiquity Records)
  - featuring Tiombe Lockhart
  - featuring Georgia Anne Muldrow
- "Act Like You Know"* b/w "Now Or Never"^ - (2005, Ubiquity Records)
  - featuring J Dilla
  - featuring Tiombe Lockhart
- "Shotgun", "Fever" (2005, Ubiquity Records)
  - featuring Jay Dee (J Dilla), Invincible & Medaphoar
