= Russell Taylor (musician) =

American singer and songwriter

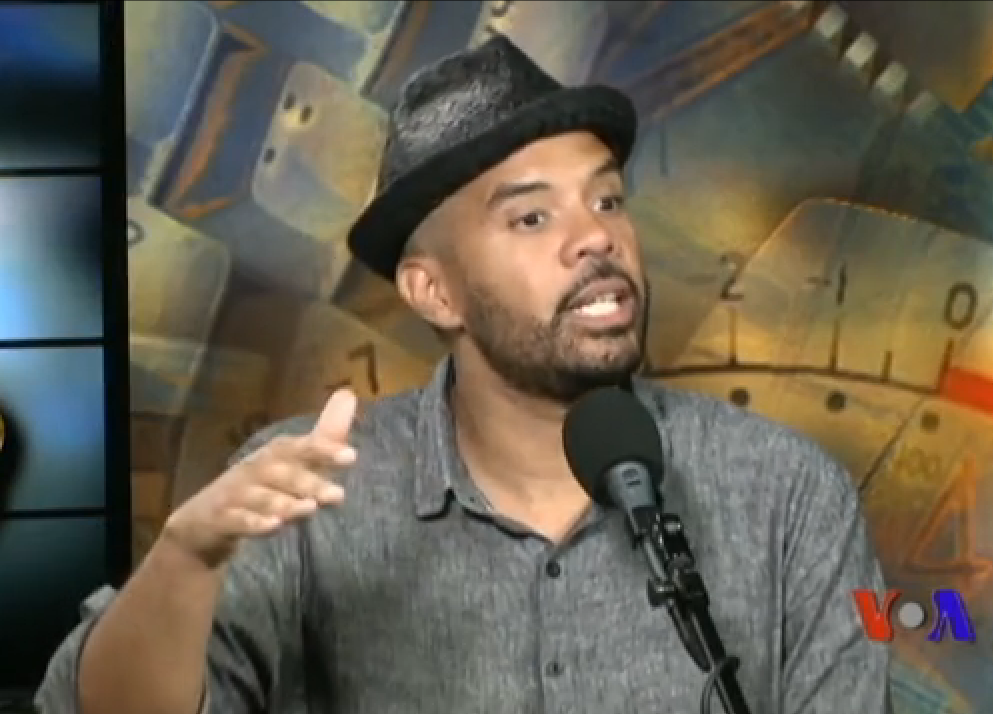
- Taylor in 2013

Background information
- Origin: United States
- Occupations: Singer, songwriter
- Website: www.russelltaylor.net

Russell Taylor is an American singer and songwriter.

In 2013, VH1 featured him as part of the "You Oughta Know" series. He subsequently went on to win the title of "You Oughta Know" artist for December.

== Early career ==
Under his original stage name Russell he released Fool for Love in 2000, which peaked at number 52 on the UK singles chart, produced by The Basement Boys, with a remix by Olav Basoski. The song was featured on the Ministry of sound collection. He was a featured vocalist on Last Dance and Holiday, also by the Basement Boys and released on Basement Boys Records later in 2000., .

In 2008, two of his songs All Said & Done and 2b loved were featured on the movie soundtrack for the 2007 movie Dirty Laundry.

== Discography ==
Somewhere in Between (2006) Featuring the single 2b loved.

Confessional (2010)

War of Hearts CD Single (2013). The song was inspired by the TV show Scandal. The song was featured TV Shows Black Ink Crew Season 2, Episode 8, Degrassi: The Next Generation Episode 15 "Black and White" from Season 13, and The Fosters Episode 16 "Us Against The World" from Season 1.

Tin Man : The Blue (2017). Features single Thrill.
