= Lisa Shaw (musician) =

Canadian R&B and house music singer

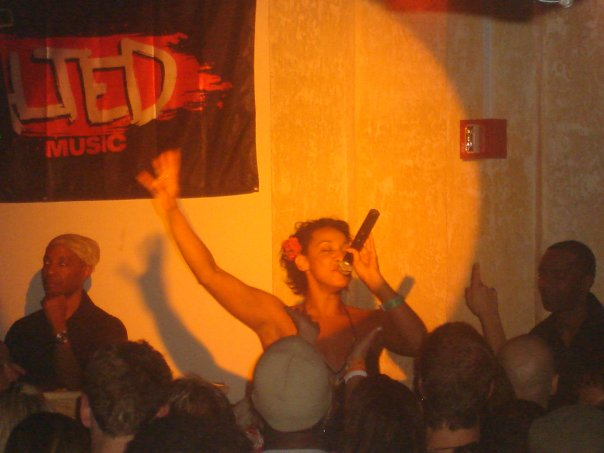
- Lisa Shaw @ Live

Background information
- Born: Scarborough, Ontario, Canada
- Origin: Toronto, Ontario, Canada
- Genres: House; R&B
- Occupation: Singer-songwriter
- Years active: 1995–present
- Labels: Naked Music; Salted Music

Lisa Shaw is an R&B and house music singer from Toronto, Ontario, Canada.

== Biography ==
=== Early life ===
Born in Canada to Jamaican parents, Lisa Shaw was raised in Scarborough, Ontario the youngest of six kids. Growing up, Lisa was influenced by artists such as Sade, Billie Holiday, Stevie Nicks, Roberta Flack and Kate Bush. Tagging along to clubs with her older sisters exposed her to disco/funk acts Chic, Sister Sledge, The S.O.S. Band and Kool & the Gang. Shaw married David Winsett (DJ Swingsett) in 1995, and she moved to New York City then to live with him. The couple is now divorced.

=== Music career ===
Lisa Shaw's music career expanded when she arrived in New York City from Toronto. Shaw is part of the underground electronica/deep house music communities. She debuted in 1995 with a single titled, "Makin' Love Makin' Music", written by DJ Smash. She has collaborated on deep house projects, most notably with producer/songwriter, Miguel Migs.

Shaw released her debut solo album, Cherry, on October 25, 2005 on the Naked Music label. Her debut album peaked at number 20 on the Billboard Top Dance/Electronic Albums chart in November 2005. One of the album's singles, "Born to Fly," was reached number 25 on the Dance Singles Sales chart.

Shaw appears as a featured singer on Miguel Migs's 2007 album, Those Things. Kaba Modern used a remix of her single, "Grown Apart," on the first season of America's Best Dance Crew in 2008.

Shaw released her second album, "Free", in 2009 on Salted Music. The album was produced by Dave Warrin, Tim K, Ethan White of Tortured Soul and Miguel Migs. She performed the album at release on KCRW's Morning Becomes Eclectic, with producer Tim K and DJ Joshua Heath.

== Discography ==
=== Albums ===
- 2005 Cherry
- 2009 Free

=== Singles ===
- "Makin' Love Makin' Music"
- "Always"
- "Let It Ride (Jimpster Remix)"
- "Cherry"
- "Born To Fly"
- "Side To Side" (feat. Miguel Migs)
- "Find The Way" (Jask Soul Seduction Vocal)
- "Always" (Lovetronic Vocal)
- "This Melody" Miguel Migs ft. Lisa Shaw
