= Miguel Migs =

American DJ and music producer

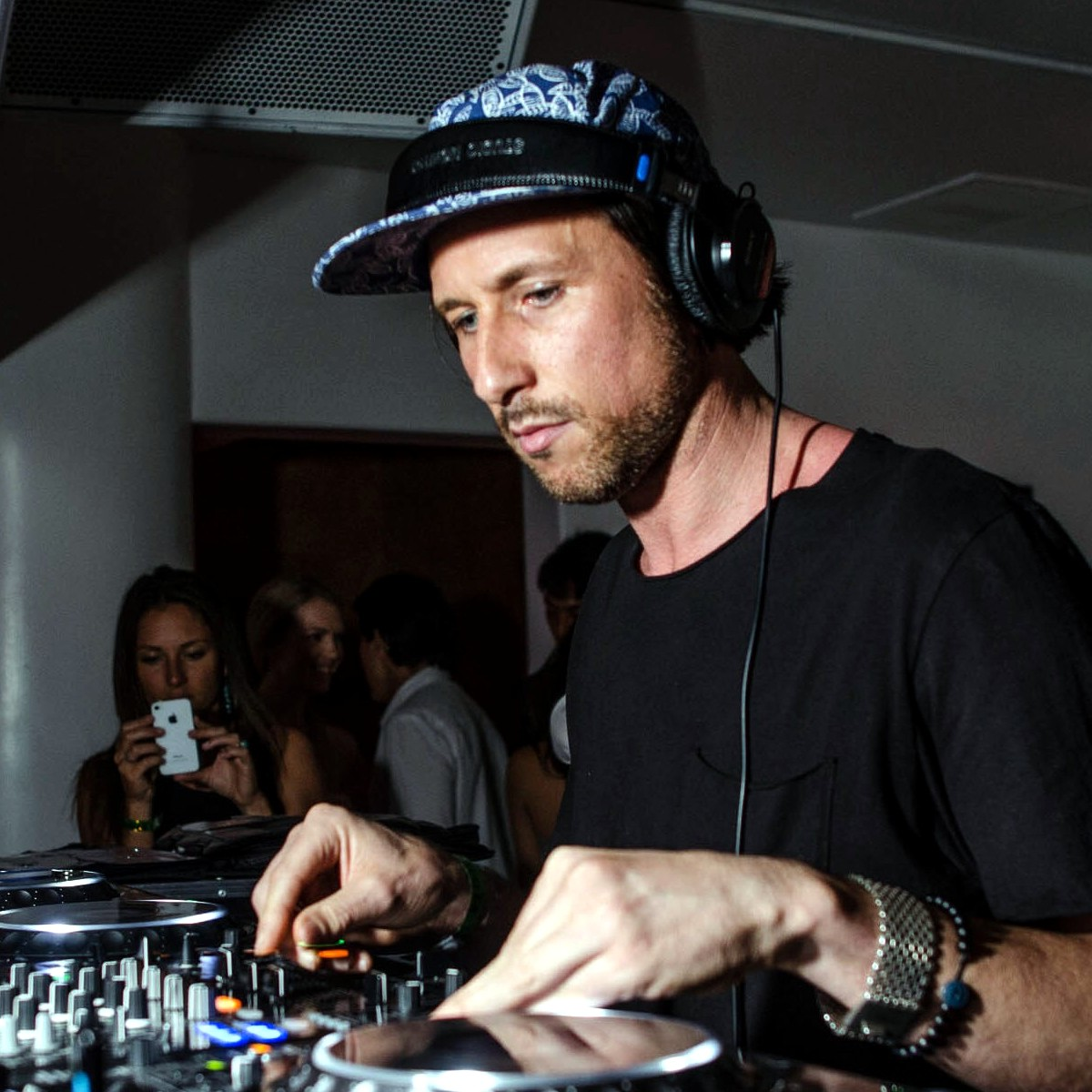
- Migs in 2014

Background information
- Birth name: Miguel Steward
- Born: December 6, 1972 (age 52)
- Origin: San Francisco, California, U.S.
- Genres: Deep house; soul; funk; nu-disco; electronic
- Occupations: DJ; music producer
- Years active: 1990s–present
- Labels: Salted Music, Om Records, Defected Records
- Website: miguelmigs.com

Miguel Steward (born December 6, 1972) better known by his stage name Miguel Migs, is an American deep house DJ and producer and the founder of Salted Music, an independent electronic dance music record label based in San Francisco, California.

== Biography ==
Migs began his music career at 18 years old, as a lead guitarist and songwriter for a Santa Cruz local band called Zion Sounds. The band split up in the mid-1990s, however Zion Sounds' African and Jamaican style is said to have been a major influence in Migs' personal career. After the band dissolved, Migs went on to explore electronic music production thus creating his unique and soulful sound.

Miguel has produced over 100 remixes to date, including remixes for a number of mainstream artists. Such artists include Britney Spears, Macy Gray and Lionel Richie. Miguel Migs has been associated with a variety of record labels, most notably Salted Music and Om Records and Naked Music Recordings .

In 1998, Miguel co-founded the deep house record label Transport Recordings, along with fellow DJ MFR and Naked Music label director Bruno Ybarra. Migs was credited for his soul-driven vibes and hailed as one of the pioneers of the nascent house and chill-out revival scene alongside Dimitri from Paris and Bob Sinclar as a result of his early foray into Deep House in the late 1990s and early 2000s, releasing several highly sought after singles and remixes under the Petalpusher pseudonym. In 2005 he founded Salted Music, an independent record label.

In early 2008, Migs' Those Things won in The 7th Annual Independent Music Awards for Best Dance/Electronica Album. In 2009 Miguel Migs' Salted Music won the Independent Music Awards Vox Pop vote for best Indie Label Site.

Miguel Migs grew up in Northern California on his parents' diverse collection of classic rock, blues, funk, soul and reggae records – which helped set the tone for his musical inspirations. He infuses these creative influences into his own sound, which combines this wide range of styles, blending them together into his own unique artistry.

Migs emerged from the '90s deep house underground scene to become the kind of artist who transcends the stylistic limitations of a genre so very few can. His musical journey began after picking up a guitar in his early teenage years and his first outlet was writing songs and playing in Dub/Reggae bands. Although Migs always loved and listened to all different styles of music, in the early 1990s he connected to the soulful sounds of Deep House. By the mid '90s he began experimenting with producing electronic dance music. And by the time the new millennium dawned, a string of releases and remixes on numerous leading indie dance labels earned him an enviable reputation among discerning dance music fans worldwide. As Petalpusher, he'd also become a stalwart of the hugely influential Naked Music stable with his original productions, remixes and compilations.

His well-received 2002 debut album Colorful You was released on the legendary Astralwerks label, and Migs began to attract attention from the broader music community, remixing big-name artists as diverse as Macy Gray, Lionel Richie and Britney Spears. After years of relentless nonstop global touring, his 2007 follow-up album Those Things saw him collaborating with big-hitting names like hip-hop legend Sadat X and reggae icon Junior Reid, among others. The album was nominated for Best Dance Album in the Independent Music Awards, and was also included in Virgin Records yearly 'Virgin Recommends 24 ECD' promotion, as well as the single "So Far" entering the Top 5 on the Billboard Dance chart and #5 on the iTunes dance chart.

Those Things was released on Migs' own label, Salted Music. Founded in 2004, he launched Salted Music as a creative outlet for, in his own words, "music I like to play as a DJ, those B-side dubs, that underground creative feel. I never set out for it to be a large record label, it's something we do pretty much on a part-time basis for fun as a side project. but it's also important to me to be able to keep pushing new sounds and new artists."

Migs' last album Outside the Skyline (which debuted in the iTunes top 10 dance chart and received rave reviews by top publications) featured various collaborators including disco diva Evelyn "Champagne" King, neo-soul vocalist and bassist Meshell Ndegeocello, reggae legends Half-Pint and Freddie McGregor, Berlin based jazz singer Georg Levin and bossa nova star Bebel Gilberto, who all make an appearance on the album, alongside two vocalists who've been regular collaborators through the years, Aya and Lisa Shaw.

== Record label ==
In 2004, Miguel Migs started his own record label, Salted Music. No stranger to independent and major labels, the founding of Salted Music was a more personal venture.

The idea behind Salted is for Miguel Migs to have a creative outlet for releasing forward thinking; soul based electronic music that is not limited in tempo. Not just instituted for Migs' own creations, Salted is a vehicle for upcoming and well-known artists who come across his path and catch his ear.

== Discography ==
=== Albums ===
- 2002: Colorful You (reached #14 on Top Electronic Albums)
- 2007: Those Things (reached #15 on Top Electronic Albums)
- 2011: Outside the Skyline
- 2014: Dim Division
- 2021: Shaping Visions

=== EPs ===
- 1998: The Mercury Lounge
- 1999: Future Flight
- 1999: Hardnights (with Marc Jellybear)
- 1999: Summer Spectrum (with DJ Rasoul)
- 1999: The Fog City
- 1999: The Night Affair
- 1999: The Roundtrip
- 1999: True Formula (with DJ Rasoul)
- 1999: Very Chic (with Marc Jellybear)
- 2000: Find What's Mine
- 2000: Inner Excursions
- 2000: Take Me to Paradise
- 2001: Friend of the Blues (with Jay-J)
- 2001: Mi Destino
- 2001: The Soul Selecta
- 2001: Underwater Sessions
- 2002: Dreaming
- 2002: Dubplate Sessions
- 2004: City Sounds Trilogy
- 2013: Heartbeat (with Lisa Shaw)
- 2016: Waterfall (with Lisa Shaw)

=== DJ mixes ===
- 1999: Nude Dimensions 1
- 2001: Nite: Life 03
- 2002: Goldclub Series Presents Klub Love (Promo, with Maurizio Aviles)
- 2002: Nude Tempo One (reached #17 on Top Electronic Albums)
- 2003: In the House: West Coast Sessions
- 2003: Southport Weekender
- 2004: Nite:Life 020
- 2004: 24th Street Sounds
- 2005: House of Om Presents: Get Salted, Volume 1 (#20 Top Electronic Albums)
- 2007: Coast2Coast
- 2009: Get Salted Volume 2
- 2012: Nikki Beach Miami
- 2013: Southport Weekender Volume 10
