= PUSH (opera) =

Opera by Howard Moody

PUSH is an English-language opera in one act, with libretto and music by Howard Moody.

The opera is based on events during the Holocaust in Belgium, specifically the story of Simon Gronowski's escape from a Holocaust train on April 19, 1943.

== Background ==
Gronowski escaped from the convoy in the aftermath of an attack from three Belgian resistance members. The title is a reference to the central event of the opera, Simon being pushed off the convoy by his mother, who died three days later at Auchwitz. His sister also died at Auchwitz.

The opera was created after Gronowski met Howard Moody at La Monnaine in Brussels. Gronowski had been attending one of Moody's operas before they met. Gronowski said about this event: "When I told him my life had only been miracles, he wrote it down there and then and told me his next opera would be about me".

== Performance history ==
PUSH had its world premiere on Saturday 1 October 2016, at the De La Warr Pavilion in Bexhill-on-Sea, East Sussex, with the performance featuring an amateur choir. Gronowski was guest of honour.

PUSH was performed at Speaker's House on Monday 28 January 2019. Speaker John Bercow described the opera as being a means of both "remembering and preventing a repetition of the Holocaust".

During the Covid-19 pandemic, on 19 April 2020, 150 singers performed the finale of the opera on the 77th anniversary of the attack on the convoy. The performance included singers from all previous stagings of the opera, both from Belgium and the UK.

== Summary ==
PUSH tells of the escape of Simon Gronowski, from the twentieth convoy as an eleven year old boy in 1943. In the aftermath of the attack on the convoy, the prisoners are emboldened to attempt escape and Simon is pushed from the carriage.
