= Sarah Goldberg (spy) =

Polish resistance fighter

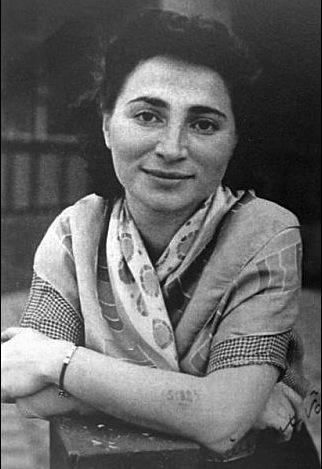
- Sarah Goldberg, just after the ending of the war
- Born: 1 January 1921; Warta, Poland
- Died: 10 June 2003 (aged 82); Brussels Belgian
- Occupations: resistance fighter, human rights activist
- Espionage activity
- Allegiance: Red Orchestra
- Service years: 1941-1943

Sarah Goldberg (1 January 1921 – 10 June 2003) was a Polish resistance fighter and human rights activist. Goldberg became part of a Soviet espionage group that operated in Europe in World War II that would later be identified by the Abwehr as the Red Orchestra ("Rote Kapelle").

== Life ==
Goldberg was born into a very poor working-class pious Jewish Polish family consisting of 9 siblings, four of whom died in infancy. Goldberg was only a nine months old when her mother, Eve (Jentka) Goldberg née Eisenstein died of Typhus. Her father was Berek Goldberg, who moved the family to Łódź after her mother died, settling in the Jewish quarter. On the 6 December 1928, her father married Gevetka Frenkiel, who was given the name "Aunt Rywka" by the family. Less than a year later in August 1929, her father again decided to emigrate, settling in a house in Rue des Vétérinaires in Anderlecht, Brussels, to escape the antisemitic pogroms. Her father sold hosiery and haberdashery for a living.

Goldberg attended the local primary school in the Jewish quarter in Anderlecht and took her secondary education in the commercial section of the technical secondary school at the Institut Marius Renard.

On 5 November 1949, Goldberg married Jacques Icek (1916–1994) a leather good sales representative and bag designer. Together they both obtained Belgian citizenship, Icek in June 1948 and Goldberg on 18 June 1953.

== Politics ==
In 1936, at the age of fifteen, under the influence of her sister Esther and brother-in-law Marcus Lustbader, she joined a left-wing Jewish sports club "Unite" on Rue des Foulons, that was run by communist militants. As foreigners were banned from being members of left-wing organisations, the club members practiced gymnastics. There she acquired a political education and took part in solidarity campaigns in support of the International Brigades in Spain.

== World War II ==
After the invasion of Belgium and the exodus in 1940, Goldberg and her siblings fled Belgium by train and took refuge in Saint-Ferréol-de-Comminges in the south of France. Goldberg's father and step mother were both too old to travel so stayed in Brussels. (Note: On 26 September 1942 Goldberg's father and her step-mother, Berek Goldberg and Gevetka Frenkiel were deported by Convoy no. 11 to Auschwitz concentration camp, and killed in the gas chambers two days later.) In Saint-Ferréol, Goldberg found work as an office clerk in the local police station. There she prepared lists of people who fought alongside the Republican forces in the Spanish Civil War who had escaped from the internment camps at Gurs and Saint-Cyprien, Pyrénées-Orientales. When Goldberg wasn't noticed, she would copy the names of the escapees to a separate sheet and pass them to trusted friends who ensured the wanted men weren't found. After six months when their residence permit had expired, Goldberg and her siblings decided to return to Brussels, necessitating the use of a smuggler who smuggled them into Belgium. When she returned, Goldberg and her sibling lived clandestinely. In Brussels, Goldberg returned to her militant activities by joining her friends who were in the Jeunes Gardes Socialistes (Young Socialist Guards), a Belgian socialist youth organisation, and worked to distribute leaflets and underground newspapers.

== Red Orchestra ==
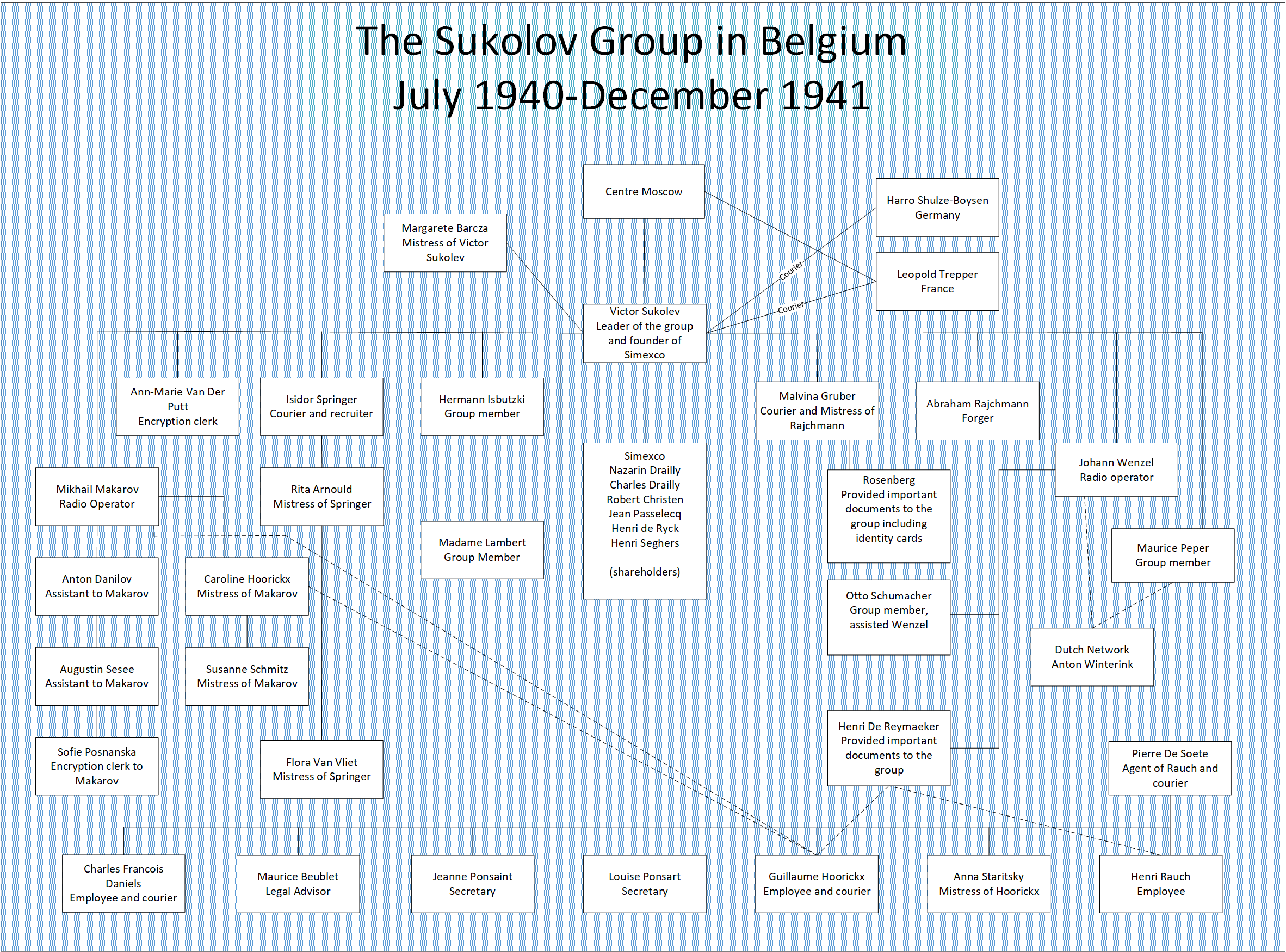
Gurevich group that operated between July 1940 to December 1941 in Belgium. The diagram, compiled by British intelligence, shows active members of the espionage network. As Goldberg never became active in the network her name is not shown. However, according to Bourgeois, Goldberg along with Gurevich were two of the last surviving members of the Rote Kapelle with Goldberg dying in 2003 and Gurevich dying in 2009.

When Goldberg returned to Brussels, she found work as a secretary in a milliner's shop called Modiste de la Reine. In June 1941, Goldberg was recruited by Hermann Isbutzki to work for a soviet espionage organisation run by the GRU that was later given the name Red Orchestra ("Rote Kapelle") by the German Abwehr. Isbutzki was formerly a soldier in the Botwin Jewish Company that was part of the International Brigades during the Spanish Civil War. Isbutzki had himself been recruited into espionage for the Soviets by Leopold Trepper in December 1938. Goldberg was given the code name of "Lili" and trained as a wireless telegraphist by Anatoly Gurevich. Her mission was as a replacement or backup for Anton Danilov, a wire telegraphist who was part of a sub-group that was run by Gurevich and that operated from a safehouse at 101 Rue des Atrébates in Etterbeek, Brussels. On 12 December 1941, the Rue des Atrébates safehouse was raided by the Abwehr and all the people who worked there were arrested. Goldberg, who occasionally visited the safehouse to meet the group members and to learn the wireless transmission procedures, wasn't there at the time of the Abwehr raid and escaped arrest.

In late July 1942, Isbutzki was arrested. For two or three weeks Goldberg heard nothing and began to panic as Isbutzki knew her home address. However, Goldberg knew that Isbutzki was likely arrested as their prior arrangements for meeting, gave this indication. As Isbutzki never revealed any details of the espionage organisation after being tortured, Goldberg remained safe from the Sonderkommando who arrested so many other members of the Red Orchestra in Belgium and later France and the low countries. Izbutski was executed at Plötzensee Prison in Berlin on 6 July 1944.

== Partisans ==
During the several months that Goldberg worked for the Red Orchestra, she continued to work in the milliner's shop, in essence using it for cover. After several months it became apparent that Izbutski was not coming back. Afterwards Goldberg met her friend Leibke Rabinowiz, who put her in contact with Jacob Gutfrajnd (1909–1991), who led the 1st Jewish Partisans of the Partisans Armés in Brussels, that was directly linked to the Front de l'Indépendance. As a partisan, Goldberg worked to identify, determine the movements of and execute Nazi collaborators and German officers who were a threat to the partisans. One of these collaborators was Icek Glogowski. Several attempts were made to kill Glogowski by various people including Youra Livchitz but his attempt on 27 April 1943 failed, when his gun jammed.

== Arrest ==
Following a denunciation, Goldberg was arrested by the Gestapo on 4 June 1943 at her home in Forest in Brussels, at the same time as her fiancé Henri Wajnberg and her close friend Laja Bryftreger-Rabinowitch. Goldberg was taken to Gestapo headquarters on Avenue Louise in Brussels and then the three were transferred to the Mechelen transit camp in Mechelen. Goldberg like Wajnberg, who was killed in a gas chamber on 25 January 1944, was registered on the deportation list of transport XXI under no. 525. This convoy initially comprised 1,563 people, including 208 children. The convoy left Mechelen on 31 July 1943 and arrived in Auschwitz concentration camp on 1 August 1943. Goldberg was registered with a tattoo bearing no. 51825. While there she suffered from numerous illnesses including typhus, dysentery, boils and scurvy. On 18 January 1945, she took part in the Auschwitz-Birkenau death march, arriving at the Ravensbrück concentration camp on 22 January 1945, then on to Malchow to work in a Sonderkommando on 26 February 1945. On 23 April 1945, Goldberg was liberated by the Red Army and deported from Germany to a repatriation centre in Verviers, Belgium on 3 June 1945. On 6 June 1945, Goldberg became a member of the Communist Party of Belgium.

== After the war ==
After the war, Goldberg recuperated in a home in Blankenberge that was run by a group associated with the Front de l'Indépendance. After her recuperation, Goldberg began working for the Aide aux Israélites Victimes de la Guerre (Aid for Israelite Victims of the War), a position she held for eight months. In 1992, Goldberg created a video log of her experiences in the concentration camps, for the Auschwitz Foundation that is hosted at the Fortunoff Video Archive for Holocaust Testimonies. In 1998, she visited the Anderlecht Institute of the Marius Renard Institute and was named an honorary pupil.

== Awards and honours ==
- 1949 Resistance Medal
