= Marcel Hastir =

Belgian artist, theosophist and member of the Belgian Resistance

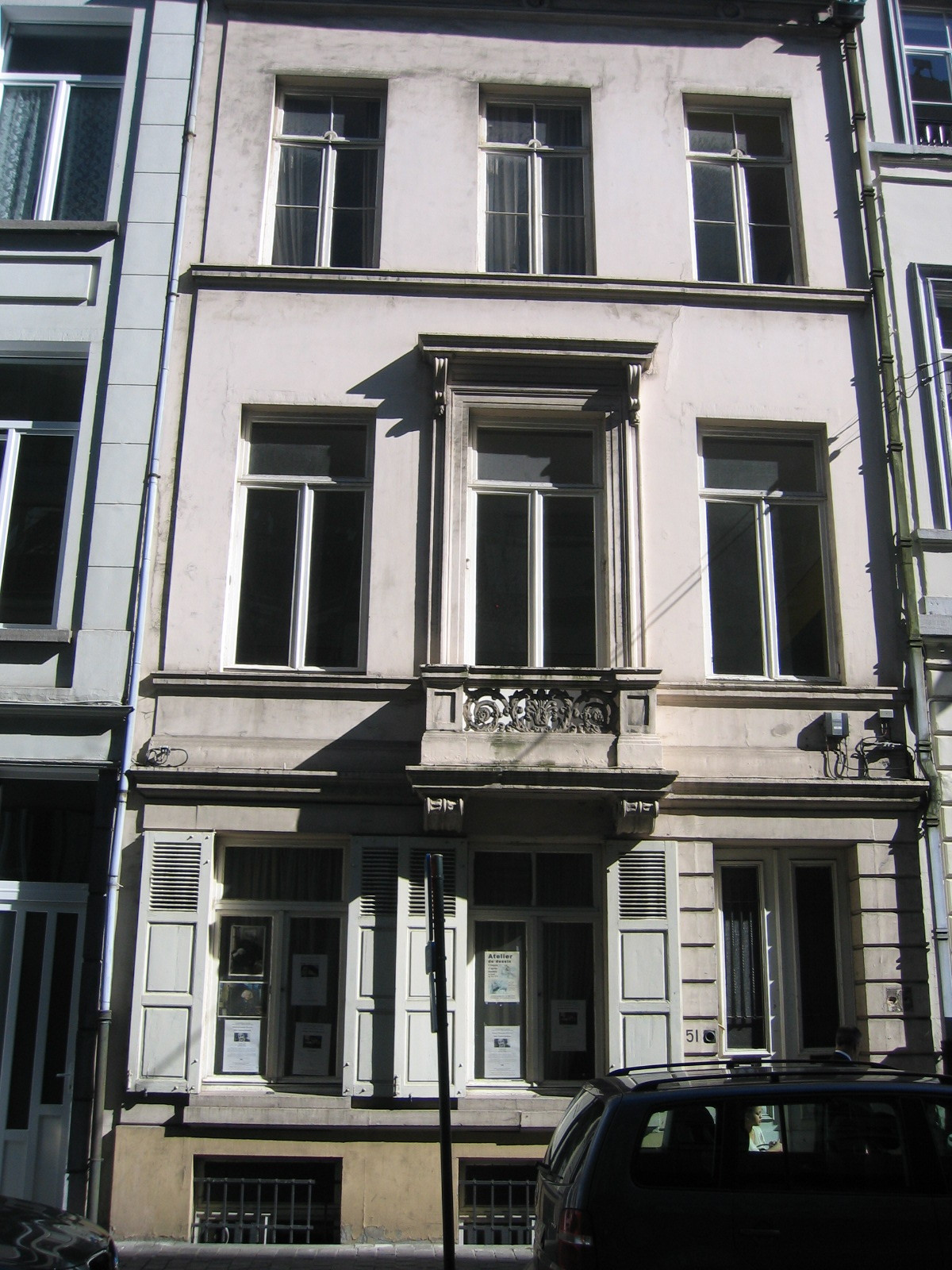
- The Marcel Hastir Workshop; 51, Rue du Commerce in Brussels
- Born: 22 March 1906; Brussels, Belgium
- Died: 2 July 2011 (aged 105); Brussels, Belgium
- Website: ateliermarcelhastir.eu

Marcel Hastir (22 March 1906 – 2 July 2011), was an artist, theosophist and member of the Belgian Resistance during World War II. He lived from 1935 onwards at 51 Rue du Commerce, Brussels, which is also where he set up his studio. From the outset, it was a place where young musicians came to perform.

Today there are two prizes bearing his name which are awarded by the Académie Royale de Belgique (Belgian Royal Academy), one for music and one for painting.

== Biography ==
Hastir was born in Brussels on 22 March 1906.

Marcel Hastir was a pupil of artists Constand Montald, Emile Fabry and Jean Delville and of the sculptor Victor Rousseau. During his military service, he took part in preparing the celebrations to mark the centenary of the birth of Belgium (1930). Later he designed the décor of the Chemistry Pavilion at the 1935 Brussels Universal Exhibition.

In 1935, he moved to 51 rue du Commerce in the part of Brussels known as "Quartier Léopold".

In 1940, he managed to secure permission from the German occupying authorities to use his studio for drawing and painting lessons. However, this "art school" was above all a cover which enabled young people to meet in relative safety.

These people included Alexandre and Youra Livchitz, friends from before the war who had sat as models for Hastir on occasion. These brothers would use his studio as a meeting place and printing shop for their anti-nazi leaflets on his reneo machine. It was there the brothers and their friend Jean Franklemon decided that they would make the daring attack on the transporting bringing Jews to Auschwitz.

== The Marcel Hastir Workshop ==
When the war was over, he resumed painting, teaching art and restoring older paintings. At this time too, he and his wife Ginette van Rijkevorsel van Kessel (they married in 1946) became more and more active in organizing events of a musical, literary, theatrical and intellectual nature at the Atelier. They formalized these activities in 1949 by setting up a not-for-profit organisation called "L'Atelier – Maison des Arts Coordonnés".

The arts which over the years have found a home at the Atelier are indeed extremely diverse: the Hastirs were among the earliest to appreciate the talents of artists such as Charles Trenet, Jacques Brel, Barbara, Maurice Béjart, Lola Bobesco, Carlo Van Neste, and Narciso Yepes, to name but a few hosts of the Atelier. They provided a podium from which these artists, but also intellectuals and men of action, e.g. Lanza del Vasto, Père Dominique Pire and Abbé Pierre, could address the public. Marcel Hastir's biography contains many anecdotes from this culturally thriving period ("Une Vie", republished in 2013). Ginette died in 1983.

Quartier Léopold became a target for real estate brokers and developers and – possessing only a tenancy of two floors of the building – Marcel Hastir had to battle for years with attempts to evict him from his home and studio. The most recent attempts were in 2002 (demolition was threatening) and 2004 (a notice to quit was served on him). Both were defeated thanks to the mobilization of citizens and associations in support of the aged painter, cultural icon and resistance fighter.

In 2005, Hastir asked his helpers to set up a foundation to bear the name of his Atelier, to be known as the "Fondation Atelier Marcel Hastir" and to which he bequeathed all his works.

On 22 March 2006, his 100th birthday, the City of Brussels made him an Honorary Citizen, and Brussels Region officially classed his studio as part of the historic and cultural heritage of Brussels. RTBF broadcast a documentary by Caroline Hack entitled 51, Rue du Commerce, about Marcel Hastir's life and work.

On 24 April 2008, the Jewish Community of Brussels awarded him the accolade of "Mensch of the Year" in recognition of his actions to assist his Jewish fellow citizens during the war years. Also, the Belgian State, represented by Deputy Prime Minister Laurette Onkelinx, announced its decision to support Fondation Atelier Marcel Hastir in its efforts to prevent the building at 51 rue du Commerce from being purchased with speculative aims.

With this backing, the City of Brussels was able to purchase it in February 2010. Fondation Atelier Marcel Hastir was granted a 99 year long-lease over the whole building as of 1 October 2010. All the works of Marcel Hastir, in all their manifestations, have thus been saved and are in the care of the volunteers who support the Foundation.

Atelier Marcel Hastir remains a very active place; it hosts concerts of classical and world music, theatrical events, film shows, lectures as well as classes in music, art, writing, languages and dance.

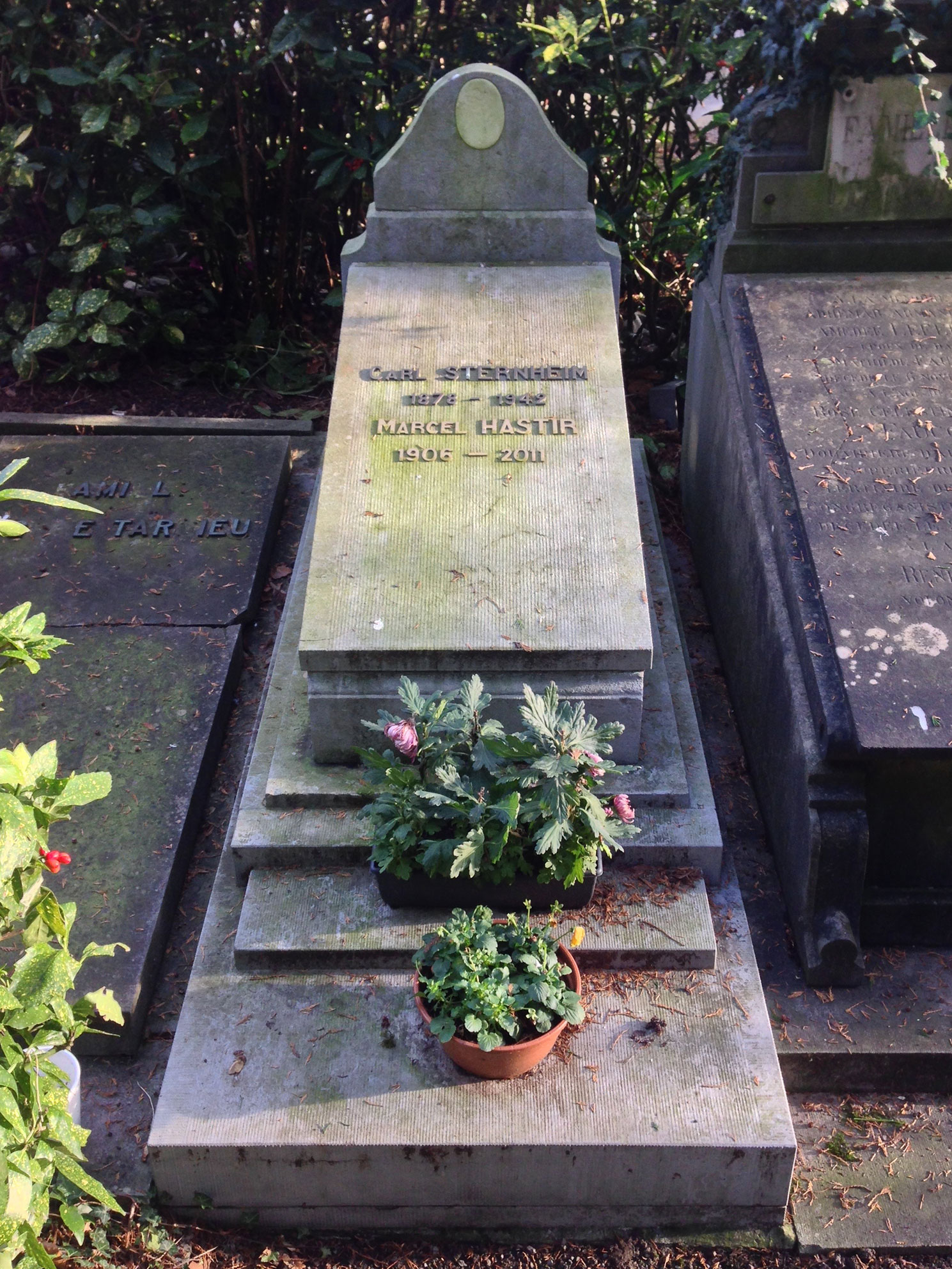
Grave of Carl Sternheim (1878–1942) and Marcel Hastir in Ixelles

Marcel Hastir died on 2 July 2011, at the age of 105. He was buried at Ixelles Cemetery in the grave of Carl Sternheim, who was a friend of his.
