= Głogowski =

Głogowski (feminine: Głogowska) is a Polish surname. It may be either a toponymic or patronymic surname derived from any of location named Głogowa, Głogowo, Głogowiec, Głogów., Notable people with the surname include:

- Anikó Glogowski-Merten
- Gerhard Glogowski
- Herman Glogowski
- Icek Glogowski
- Jim Glogowski
- Tomasz Głogowski
