= Simon Gronowski =

Belgian jurist, Holocaust survivor and jazz pianist

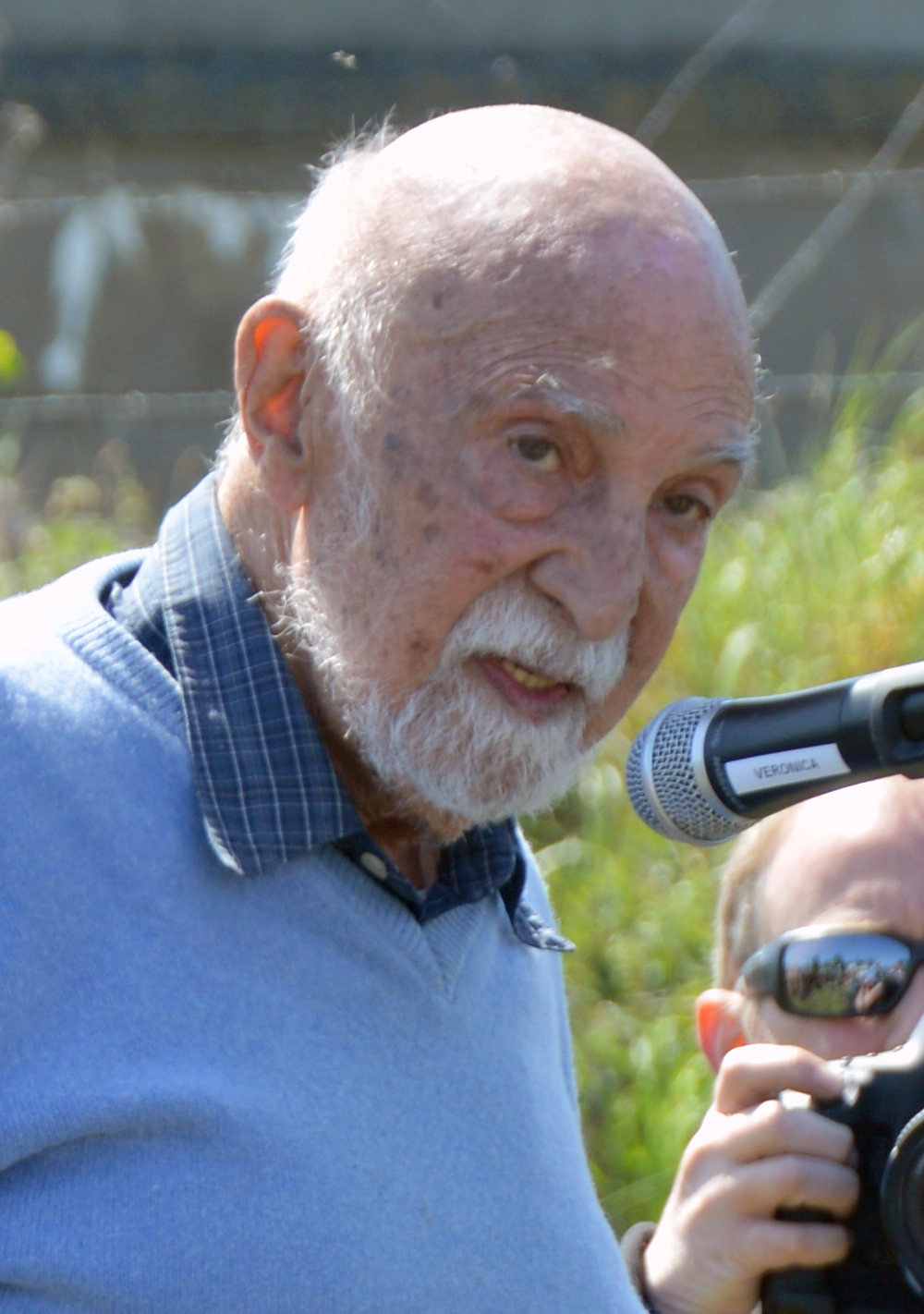
- Gronowski at the 8 May 2022 commemoration at Fort Breendonk
- Born: October 12, 1931 (age 94); Uccle, Belgium
- Education: Free University of Brussels
- Spouse: Marie-Claire Huybrechs
- Children: 2 children
- Parent(s): Léon Gronowski; Chana Kaplan
- Relatives: Ita Gronowski (sister)

Simon Gronowski (born October 12, 1931) is a doctor of law, lawyer, jazz pianist, Holocaust survivor and author of the autobiography "L'Enfant du XXe Convoi" (The Child of the 20th Convoy). He served as president of the "Association of the Jewish Deportees in Belgium. Daughters and Sons of the Deportation". His escape as a boy from a train bound for Auschwitz inspired an opera. His memoir was recounted in a children’s picture book, "Simon, le petit évadé".

== Life ==
Gronowski was born in Uccle, Brussels in Belgium in 1931. He lived there with his stateless parents, Polish-born Léon Gronowski and Lithuanian-born Chana Kaplan, and his sister Ita who had Belgian nationality. Two Gestapo men arrived and arrested them. His father was in hospital, but his mother said her husband was dead. He and his mother travelled in the same cattle truck thinking that they were being deported.

He survived the Holocaust by escaping deportation in the attack on the twentieth convoy, on 19 April 1943, which would have taken him to Auschwitz. The train they were on was uniquely stopped by three members of the resistance (Youra Livchitz, Jean Franklemon and Robert Maistriau) who had rigged up a red danger light to stop the train. The three were cleared away by gun shots and the train continued on its way. The people in his wagon managed to open the door and as the train slowed again, his mother helped him to jump from the train. He was able to return to Brussels because a Police officer ignored his instructions and he put Simon onto another train. He was reunited with his father and they then lived through the rest of the war in hiding like his father. His mother was killed at Auschwitz as was his sister who was put on transport XXII on 20 September 1943. On July 9, 1945, Simon's father died, it is said of despair in their home in Etterbeek. After spending three years in foster care, Simon survived by renting out his parents' house and in this way he managed to pay for his studies. Gronowski holds a Doctor of Law degree from the Free University of Brussels.

Later in life, after writing his memoir, he was invited to share his tale at Belgian schools and memorial events. After one of these events, he was contacted by Koenraad Tinel, a sculptor his age, whose father and brother had been enthusiastic Belgian Nazis. They became friends, wrote a book together, "Finally, Liberated", and started giving lectures together.

Friday 28 October 2018 saw the unveiling of a bronze sculpture, entitled "Embrace", in his hommage in Ganshoren, Belgium in the presence of such dignitaries as the former president of the European Council Herman Van Rompuy and historian David Van Reybrouck. It was made by his good friend Koenraad Tinel and depicts two organic figures on rails, shapes that evoke the deportation train and a very specific event in the life of the then 87-year-old Brussels resident.

In April 2020, at the height of the first wave of the COVID-19 pandemic, he began brightening lives by playing jazz tunes from his apartment window.

== PUSH opera ==
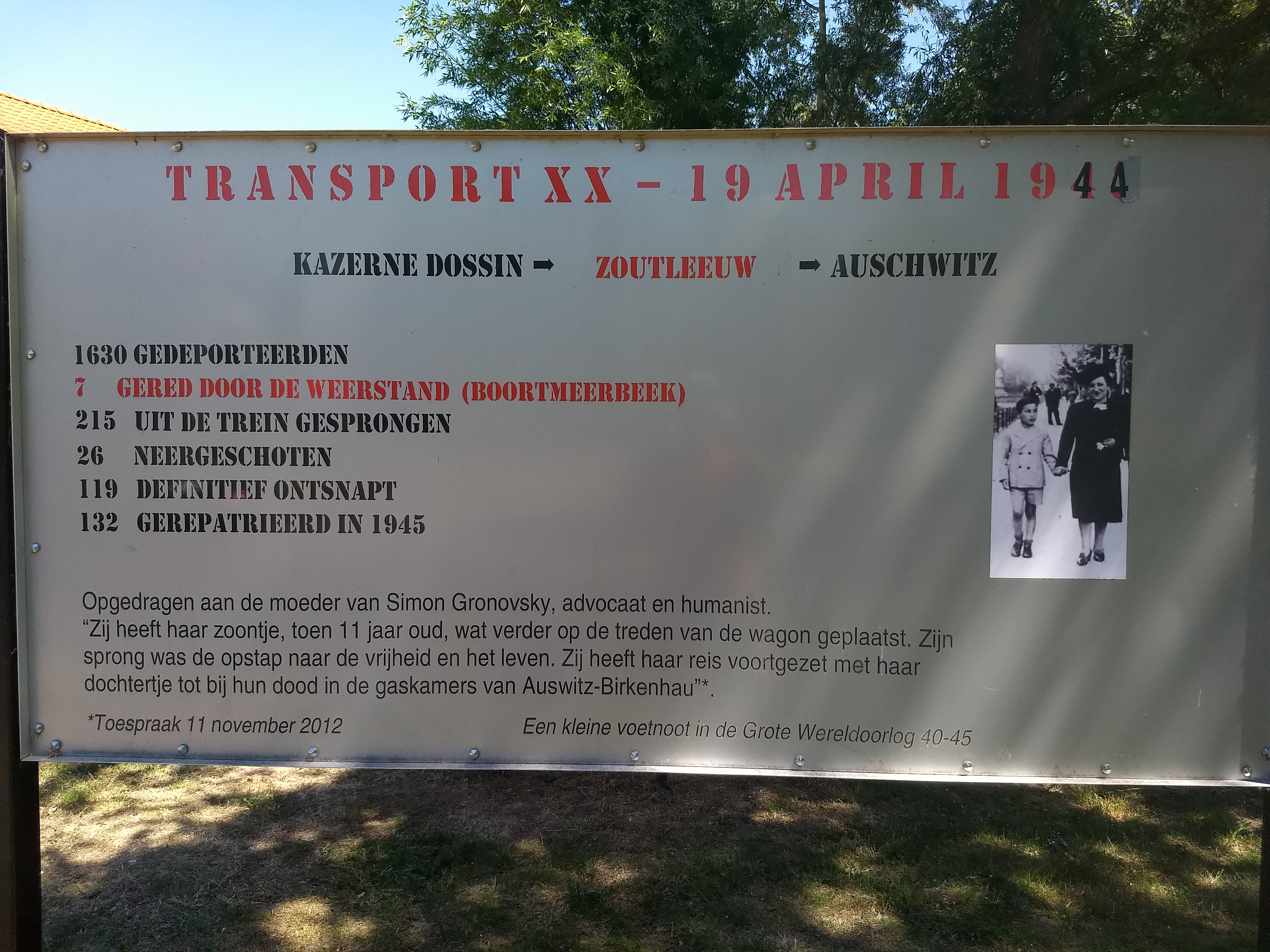
Transport XX memorial board at Zoutleeuw, Belgium, taken May 2020

In 2014, Gronowski met British composer Howard Moody at a performance of his opera Sinbad at La Monnaie Opera House in Brussels; Gronowski told the composer the story of his escape and life and ended with the phrase "ma vie n'est que miracles" (my life is nothing but miracles). Moody was so moved that he promised to write his next opera about Gronowski that night. His opera PUSH tells the story of Gronowski's escape from the twentieth convoy train on 19 April 1943, and how his mother pushed Gronowski off the train.

The opera was premiered in Bexhill-on-Sea, England, at the De La Warr Pavilion after being commissioned by the Battle Festival. Gronowski attended the premiere. After an invitation from the House of Commons, PUSH was performed on 27 January 2018 to mark Holocaust Memorial Day, where Gronowski was a special guest.

== Honours ==
- Honorary Doctorate at the Vrije Universiteit Brussel (2020)
- Ereteken van de Vlaamse Gemeenschap (2025)
- Grand Officer in the Order of the Crown (2025)
