= Schiplaken =

Coordinates: 50.98°N 4.53°E

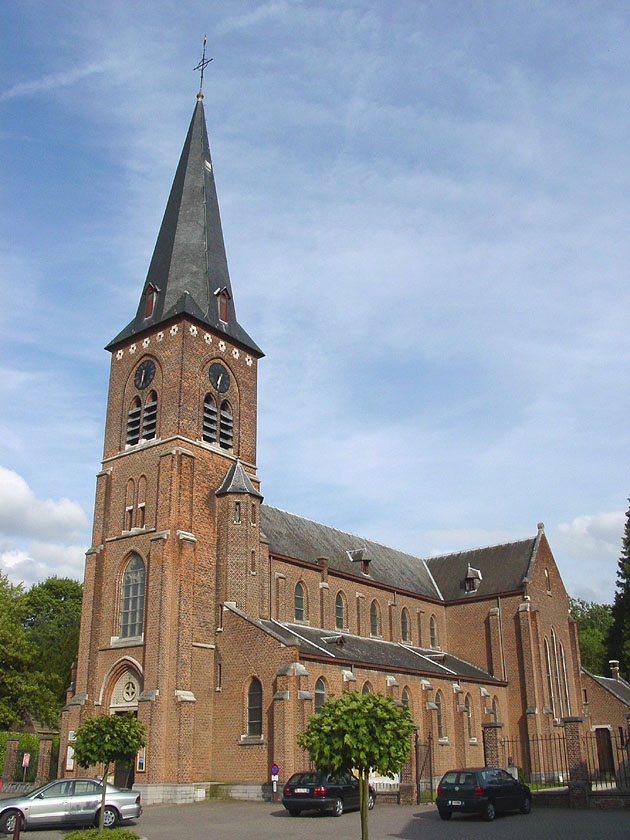
The Church of the Holy Family in Schiplaken

Schiplaken is a village within the municipality of Boortmeerbeek, in the province of Flemish Brabant, Belgium.
