= Danny Lenie =

Belgian footballer

Personal information
- Full name: Daniel Lenie
- Date of birth: 17 October 1967 (age 59)
- Place of birth: Schoten, Belgium
- Position: Centre-back

Youth career
- Capellen

Senior career*
Years	Team	Apps	(Gls)
1989–1996	Capellen		
1996–2001	Mouscron		
2001–2002	Boortmeerbeek		
2002–2004	Hoogstraten		
2004–2005	Zwarte Leeuw		
2005–2007	KFC Lille		
2007–2008	Nieuwmoer		
- * Club domestic league appearances and goals

Danny Lenie (born 17 October 1967) is a Belgian former professional footballer who played as a centre-back.
