= Gustav Mayer (art collector) =

Gustav Mayer (1856-1940) was a German Jewish businessman and art collector who was persecuted by the Nazis.

== Life ==
Mayer was born in Böchingen, Germany on 5 May 1865 and he died in Bournemouth, England, on 18 January 1940. He was married to Emma Esta Mayer (born 1864, née Grumpich). They had three children.

Business owners in Frankfurt, the Mayers also collected art. They owned thirty paintings, which were left in storage in Brussels after a fourteen-month stay in the Belgian capital from 1938-39.

== Nazi era ==
When the Nazis came to power in 1933, the Mayers were persecuted because of their Jewish heritage. Gustav and Emma Mayer fled from their home in Frankfurt to Brussels in 1938. They fled through Italy and Switzerland. In August 1939, they managed to enter Britain and settled in Bournemouth. All their property in Brussels was stolen. In the UK, German-Jewish refugees were considered "enemy aliens" and the Mayer's eldest son, Ernst, was interned by British authorities on the Isle of Man. Mayer died in 1940 and his wife Emma died in 1944.

== Restitution of a painting ==
The Mayers first inquired about Flowers in 2016. On 10 February 2022 the Royal Museums of Fine Arts in Brussels restituted Lovis Corinth’s 1913 Still Life: Red and Pink Roses in a Vase on a Tablecloth (Flowers) to the heirs of Gustav and Emma Mayer After acknowledging that the painting had been looted, the Belgian authorities initially demanded that the family pay 4,100 euros, since it had received some compensation related to Nazi persecution earlier.

The family has registered the looted collection on the German Lost Art Foundation database Lostart.de and continues to search.

== See also ==
- Reichsleiter Rosenberg Taskforce (E.R.R.)
- The Holocaust in Belgium
- Aryanization
- Nazi Germany
