= Bürger Schippel =

Play written by Carl Sternheim

Bürger Schippel (English title Schippel, the Plumber, also known as Citizen Schippel and Paul Schippel, Esq.) (1913) is a German comedy by Carl Sternheim, complete in itself but part of his cycle of plays "Aus dem bürgerlichen Heldenleben". Some of its characters, such as Heinrich Krey, appear in a number of Sternheim's works.

== Plot summary ==
Two weeks before the district's major music festival, in which the region's male voice quartets compete for a gold crown of laurel-leaves awarded by the Prince, the favourites for the title suffer a major setback when their tenor drops down dead. The three remaining members of the group – Tilman Hicketier, Andreas Wolke and Heinrich Krey – must find an immediate replacement if they are to win the crown for the third year in a row. Unfortunately, the competition requires that the singer is a resident of the principality, and there's only one tenor left who fits that description: Paul Schippel, a lowly clarinet player from the dregs of society.

Uncomfortable as he is with the idea but determined to keep the crown, Hicketier sends Schippel a highly discourteous letter summoning him to appear before them. On his arrival, Schippel presents himself in as honest and amiable a manner as possible, winning over both Krey and Wolke, but Hicketier remains biased against him because of both his lowly status and his origins: Paul Schippel is a bastard. All three surviving members of the quartet are hugely impressed with the quality of his voice, but when Schippel attempts to shake Hicketier's hand, he is ignored. Suddenly understanding that the quartet mean to use him to win the crown before discarding him once again, Schippel leaves, refusing to sing.

Hicketier refuses to reconsider his attitude against Schippel, and it appears the quartet will not be able to perform at the festival. However, a chance encounter with the Prince – who recognises the quartet members and expresses his wish that they emerge with the crown once again – forces Hicketier to approach Schippel a second time. He relents somewhat in his antagonism, but retains certain considerations; chief amongst these is that Schippel does not associate with his sister Thekla, over whom Hicketier has an intensely possessive attitude.

In the meantime, it is discovered that Thekla has an admirer, who has been stood underneath her window a number of times. Hicketier suspects Krey and Wolke, both of whom accuse the other of being in love with her. It turns out that it is in fact none other than the Prince, who staged his earlier encounter in an effort to meet her in person. They arrange to meet when the members of the quartet, now including Schippel, are busy rehearsing for the festival.

After the rehearsal is over, Schippel, drunk with the success he's been having in breaking into the middle-class society, confronts Hicketier alone and demands the hand of Thekla in marriage. Hicketier is now in an impossible situation; if he refuses, Schippel won't sing, and they'll lose the crown. Panicking over the situation, he then stumbles upon the Prince and Thekla in the middle of a sexual encounter. The Prince has no intention of marrying Thekla, which might have left her reputation in ruins; Hicketier decides marrying her to Schippel is a better alternative. Upon agreeing to the union, however, he can't resist taunting Schippel that his intended bride has lost her virginity, and – devastated – Schippel withdraws his demand, which inherently gives him no excuse to leave the quartet. Almost immediately, Krey – pushed by Wolke into confessing his love for Thekla – bursts in to ask Hicketier's permission to marry her, which is readily accepted.

The play then jumps to the morning after the festival. Schippel has won the crown for the quartet, and as he had feared, been immediately cast off by the other members. In sorrow, he announced his knowledge of Thekla's sexual past, forcing Krey to challenge him to a duel. Unaccustomed to this, Schippel tries to escape, only to accidentally come across the location of the duel itself. Krey is a bag of nerves, stuttering and complaining how his life "used to be so cozy". Schippel is also completely terrified, but is paralysed by fear, which inadvertently impresses Hicketier who takes it as a sign of valour. The signal is given for the duel to begin, and both combatants fire. Krey's shot misses, while Schippel's grazes his opponent's arm. Honour is deemed to be satisfied, and Schippel – numb with the shock of being alive – is praised from all quarters.

Finally, Schippel and Hicketier exchange a long silence, before the latter offers a complete and honest apology for his behaviour, welcoming him to the ranks of the middle classes and finally bringing himself to call the other man by his name, raising his hat and saying "goodbye, dear Mr. Schippel". Left alone, Schippel's transformation is complete; he has escaped the realm of the underclasses, and joined those who had long considered themselves his betters. For the first time in his life, he is truly happy.

== List of Characters ==
- The Prince, the young ruler of the province in which the play is set. He is infatuated by Thekla, and arranges a riding accident as a means of formally meeting her. His insistence on the quartet winning the crown for a third year in a row ultimately sets off the entire chain of events.
- Tilman Hicketier, a goldsmith. By his own admission, he is "filled with spiteful prejudice and conscious distaste for (Schippel's) background". He only manages to put this to the side because the crown is the most important thing to him, closely followed by his sister, with whom he has an almost incestuous obsession.
- Jenny Hicketier, his wife.
- Thekla Hicketier, his sister. She is the focus of a number of people's attentions in the play, including Krey, Schippel, her brother, and the Prince.
- Heinrich Krey, a civil servant and a member of the quartet. He has strong feelings for Thekla, but refuses to act on them on account of his life already being "cozy".
- Andreas Wolke, owner of a printing works. He is actually in love with Krey, but this is mistaken by everyone as being aimed at Thekla. Ultimately knowing Krey would finally be happy with her, he pushes his friend into her arms. In the entire play, he is perhaps the only character whose motives are largely selfless.
- Paul Schippel, a clarinet player in a café. He is the only tenor left in the region, and his voice is unparalleled. He sees a chance of leaving his old world behind him and joining the realms of the middle classes.
- A Doctor, present at the duel.
- Müller and Schultze, Schippel's seconds during the duel.

== Adaptations ==
"Bürger Schippel" remains popular in Germany, but along with Sternheim's other works, it is rarely performed in the English language. This is in part due to the large number of English comedies already in existence, bypassing the need for translations of German comedies. Academics have also argued that Sternheim's works are sometimes difficult to market in foreign languages due to the difficulty in categorising his style as belonging to any one specific movement.

As a result, "Bürger Schippel" has rarely been produced at a major venue in the United Kingdom. However, in August 2011, both "Paul Schippel Esq." (an alternative title often given to the play) and "The Fossil", another of Sternheim's comedies, were performed as a double-bill at the Charing Cross Theatre, London, with Kieran E. Sims taking the title role.

The play provided the basis for Ernő Góth's libretto for the 1927 opera The Tenor, by Ernst von Dohnányi.

British television film: Wings of Song (1978, ITV Sunday Night Drama).

Once seventy years have passed since the playwright's death (in 2013), the copyright will expire and the plays will enter the public domain, which may lead to an upsurge in Sternheim's works being performed in the English language.
