= Carl Sternheim =

German playwright and short story writer

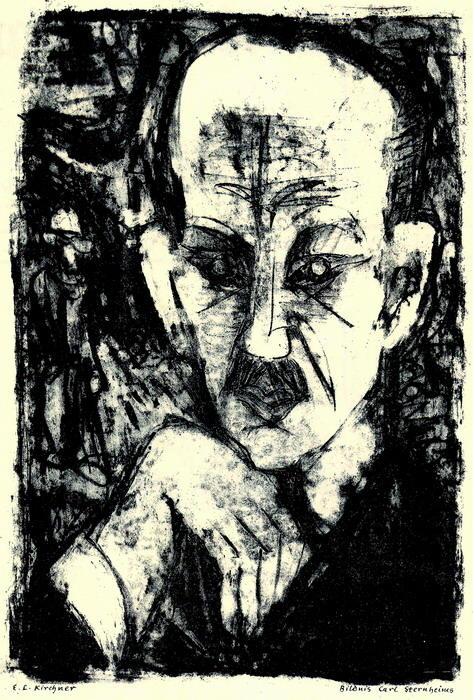
- Ernst Ludwig Kirchner portrait of Carl Sternheim 1916
- Born: William Adolph Carl Francke; 1 April 1878; Leipzig, Germany
- Died: 3 November 1942 (aged 64); Ixelles, Belgium
- Resting place: Ixelles Cemetery
- Occupations: Playwright and writer
- Spouse: Eugenie Hauth
- Writing career
- Period: Wilhelmine
- Genre: Short stories
- Subject: Moral sensibilities of the emerging German middle class
- Movement: Expressionism

Carl Sternheim (born William Adolph Carl Francke; 1 April 1878 – 3 November 1942) was a German playwright and short story writer. One of the major exponents of German Expressionism, he especially satirized the moral sensibilities of the emerging German middle class during the Wilhelmine period.

== Early life and education ==
Sternheim was born in Leipzig, the son of Rosa Marie Flora (née Francke) (1856–1908) and Carl Julius Sternheim (1852–1918), a banker. His parents married two years after he was born. His father was Jewish, and his mother was a Lutheran from a working-class family. Sternheim grew up in Hannover and Berlin. Between 1897 and 1902, he studied philosophy, psychology, and jurisprudence intermittently at the Ludwig-Maximilians-Universität München, the University of Göttingen, and Leipzig University, but never graduated.

== Family and career ==
In 1900, he began working as a freelance writer in Weimar, where he met and married his first wife Eugenie Hauth the same year. Their union ended in 1906, and he married the writer Thea Löwenstein (née Bauer) in 1907, with whom he had two children. Their daughter Dorothea ("Mopsa") was a resistance fighter during the Second World War and was imprisoned by the Nazis in the Ravensbrück concentration camp.

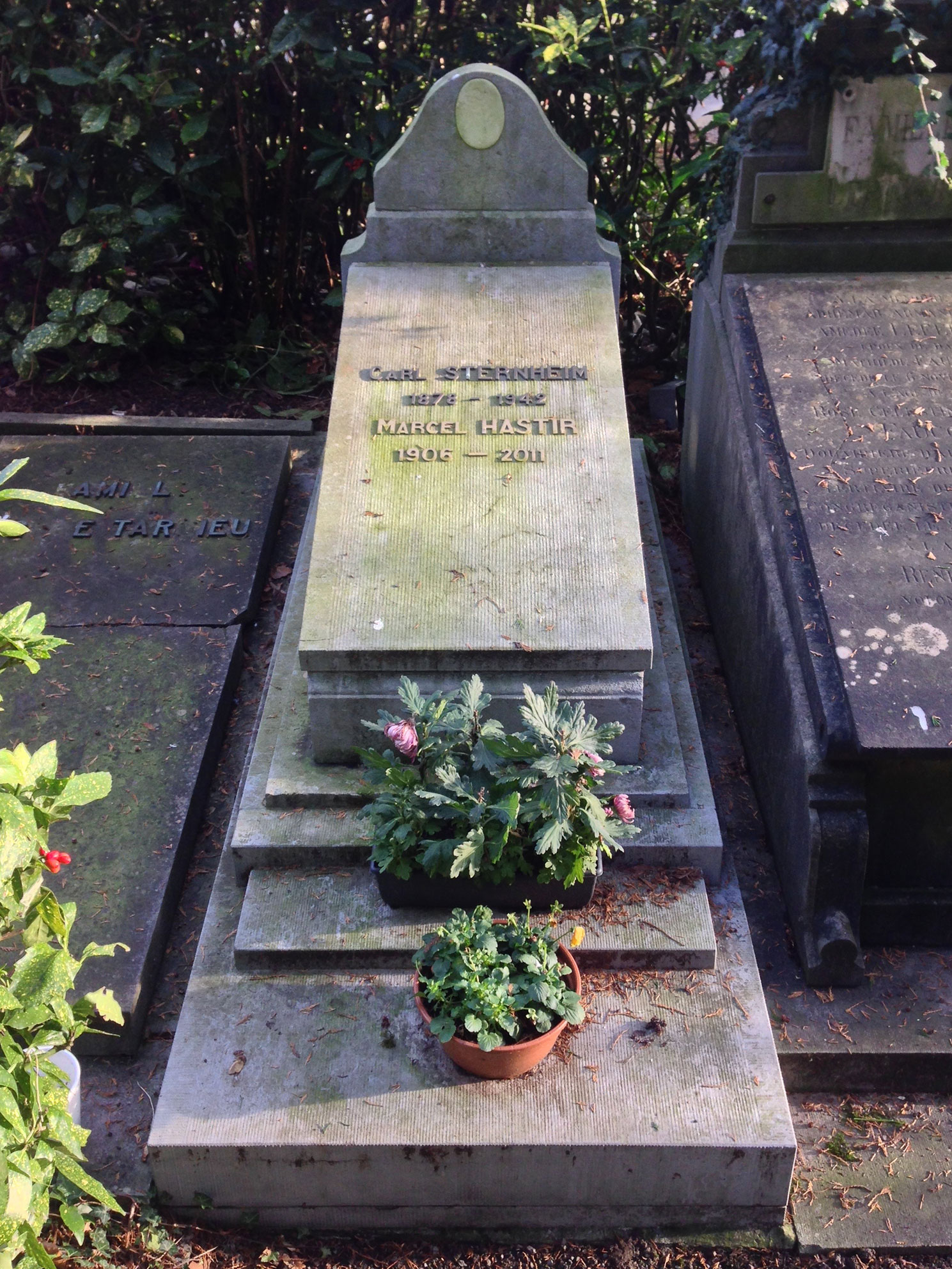
Grave of Carl Sternheim and Marcel Hastir in Ixelles

The wealth brought by Thea from her rich manufacturing family enabled the couple to build the Schloss Bellemaison in Munich. Here, Sternheim worked in the company of fellow artists such as Mechtilde Lichnowsky, Max Reinhardt, and Frank Wedekind. In 1908, he collaborated with Franz Blei to launch the Expressionist literary journal Hyperion, which published the first eight prose works by Franz Kafka. He also contributed occasionally to the Expressionist journal Die Aktion.

In 1912, he relocated with his family to Belgium and in 1918, they fled the fighting of World War I and temporarily moved to St. Moritz and Uttwil in Switzerland. Sternheim and Thea divorced in 1927. His next marriage, to actress and singer Pamela Wedekind, took place in 1930 and lasted until 1934, after which he lived with Henriette Carbonara. Sternheim died in Ixelles (Brussels) during World War II and was buried in the Ixelles Cemetery. A friend of his, Marcel Hastir (1906–2011), was buried in the same tomb.

Sternheim's circle of prominent friends included Gottfried Benn, Carl Einstein, Franz Pfemfert, Walther Rathenau, Ernst Stadler, Hugo von Tschudi, Fritz von Unruh, and Otto Vrieslander. In 1915, he presented the prize money for the Fontane Prize to the then largely unknown Kafka. The Nazi authorities banned Sternheim's work not only because of his partial Jewish descent but also because of his savage comedic assaults on the perceived moral corruption of the German bourgeoisie.

== Art collection ==
Carl Sternheim collected art. An early admirer of Vincent Van Gogh, in 1912, he lent several paintings from his collection to the International Art Exhibition in Cologne known as the 1912 Sonderbund. The Van Gogh paintings lent by Sternheim included "Still life with coffee pot, dishes and fruit", "Street in Saintes-Maries", and "L'Arlésienne", and "Entrance to the Public Park in Arles".

== Adaptations ==
Sternheim's works remain popular in Germany, but English language productions of them are rare, especially in the UK where there is a long tradition of ignoring plays not first written in English or adapting them in order to lose any foreign cultural specificities. Academics have also argued that Sternheim's works are sometimes hard to sell to the market in foreign languages due to the difficulty in categorising his style as belonging to any one specific movement.

As a result, Sternheim's plays have rarely been produced in a major venue. One notable exception occurred when Simon Callow made his West End debut in a version of Bürger Schippel (re-titled as The Plumber's Progress) alongside Harry Secombe in the 1970s. However, in August 2011, both Paul Schippel Esq. (an alternative title often given to Bürger Schippel) and The Fossil, another of Sternheim's comedies, were performed as a double-bill at the Charing Cross Theatre, London, with Kieran E. Sims and Alex Corbet Burcher in the respective title roles. In December 2018, a new adaptation of three of the short plays from Aus dem bürgerlichen Heldenleben by David Ives premiered at the Shakespeare Theatre Company in Washington, D.C. The Panties, The Partner, and The Profit were adapted from Die Hose, Der Snob and 1913, and produced with the subtitle Scenes From the Heroic Life of the Middle Class.

== Bibliography ==
- Aus dem bürgerlichen Heldenleben (From the Heroic Life of the Bourgeois), play cycle (1911–22):
  - Die Hose (The Trousers, also The Underpants)
  - Der Snob (The Snob)
  - 1913
  - Das Fossil (The Fossil)
  - Die Kassette (The Cartridge)
  - Bürger Schippel (Citizen Schippel, also Paul Schippel, Esq.)
- Schuhlin, Eine Erzahlung (Schuhlin, A Narrative) (1915)
- Kampf der Metapher (Struggle of Metaphor), essay (1917)
- Chronik von des zwanzigsten Jahrhunderts Beginn (Chronicle of the Beginning of the Twentieth Century), short stories, 1918
- Die Marquise von Arcis (The Mask of Virtue), drama (1918)
- Europa, novel, 2 vol. (1919/1920)
- Manon Lescaut, drama (1921)
- Oscar Wilde: His Drama, drama (1925)
- Vorkriegseuropa im Gleichnis meines Lebens (Prewar Europe in the Parable of My Life), memoir (1936)
