= The Fossil (play) =

German comedy by Carl Sternheim

Das Fossil (The Fossil) (1925) is a German comedy by Carl Sternheim, and is included as the fourth part of his play cycle, Aus dem bürgerlichen Heldenleben. While some of its characters appear in a number of Sternheim's other plays, The Fossil may also function as a separate piece in its own right, having its own complete story arc.

== Plot summary ==
In 1923 Traugott von Beeskow, a former Cavalry General who has lived as a social recluse since the Treaty of Versailles, receives a telegram informing him that a former comrade and aristocrat, Baron Ago von Bohna, will be visiting later that day after being released from a Russian prison. Traugott is furious about the visit, as he believes Ago has renounced the ways of the upper classes and become a communist. He immediately orders his wife, his son Otto, and his daughter Ursula – who was once in love with Ago – to prepare to repel his arrival.

Otto and his wife Sofie, far more moderate than Traugott, greet Ago with open arms, and immediately begin questioning him about his ties to communism, excitedly seeing it as "the latest thing". Ago admits he has rejected his former ways and embraced left-wing politics, but does not consider himself to be a communist, stating "we stop a long way short of Marx, but go beyond Bakunin in demanding both religion and art". He has written a book describing his new philosophy, and he states he has only returned to sell his estate in order to finance its publication. Privately, however, he admits he has returned to see Ursula.

When Ago and Ursula meet, it is obvious that they still harbour feelings for each other, but these are somewhat tempered by Ursula's closeness to her father, and her own distaste for Ago's political shift. Traugott then arrives to assess the situation, accusing Ago of "telling the most damnable lies", which Ago rejects. Before he has a chance to explain himself, Traugott leaves and calls Ursula after him. Ago remains at the house in the company of Otto and Sofie, and finds that he will have to look elsewhere for a buyer for his estate, "since Otto out of consideration for his father absolutely refuses to do the natural and profitable thing and buy it for himself".

Traugott and Ursula spend time discussing how best to deal with Ago. Ursula mentions his manuscript; Traugott sees this as the source of Ago's power, and decides that the only way to beat his enemy is to have that book destroyed. To accomplish this, he decides to use his daughter, knowing where her heart lies but confident of her ultimate loyalty to him alone. She agrees to his plan, and meets Ago alone, who had been about to return to Moscow. She convinces him to bring the manuscript to her that night, feigning interest in his ideas. Excited, and thinking there's a chance Ursula may come with him, Ago agrees, and hurries off to fetch his book.

In his absence, Traugott tells his daughter that he'll be hiding close by, and urges her to think only of the mission, and not of her feelings. She assures him that she will have no problem in seeing the plan through, but almost breaks down during a brief encounter with her mother. Ago returns, and the two of them begin to discuss his philosophy. Ursula quickly deduces that Ago's personal feelings for her contradict the teachings in his book, and uses this combined with her sexual influence to weaken his position. She ultimately succeeds for a brief moment in convincing him that his work is incomplete, and therefore insignificant, and throws it onto the fire. In the process, she succumbs to her own feelings for Ago, and the two embrace, disappearing behind the curtain.

Traugott is confident that all has gone to plan, but stands silently in position, until he hears Ursula emit a scream of ecstasy. Suddenly realising what has happened, he takes his pistol and aims it at the curtain, killing both Ago and his daughter. Otto races in, horrified, and tries to convince his father to flee the country. Traugott, defiant to the end, instead insisting on turning himself in to the authorities, shouting the final line: "Above all there must be order and justice in Germany! Hurrah!"

== List of Characters ==
- Ex-Cavalry General Traugott von Beeskow, in his seventies. He is the title character, described as a fossil "because he prefers what has been to what is coming".
- General's Wife, never named but incredibly loyal to her husband.
- Ursula, his daughter. She has remained very close to her father, but finds this loyalty tested with the arrival of Ago, whom she was once in love with.
- Otto, his son. He is not as close to Traugott as Ursula, and considers himself to belong to the middle-classes as opposed to the aristocracy. This has caused Traugott to resent his son, who refers to him as a "bourgeois-contaminated renegade". Otto uses this as a way of deflecting Ago's political attentions away from himself and onto his father.
- Sofie née von Maske, Otto's wife.
- Ulrike and Achim, their children.
- Fraulein von Rauch, the children's governess.
- Ago von Bohna, formerly a Baron who has been away for seven years, during the last five of which he was imprisoned in Russia. In his absence, he has developed views akin to communism, and has written a manuscript which he intends to have published.
- Föhrkolb, the chauffeur of the von Beeskow family.

== Adaptations ==
While popular in Germany, The Fossil – and Sternheim's work in general – is rarely performed in English. Some commentators believe a contributing factor to this is the difficulty in labelling Sternheim's works as belonging to a specific movement, while others point out that the ready availability of English-language comedies means that there is little motivation to producing a translation of a German work.

As a result, The Fossil has rarely been produced at a major venue. However, in August 2011, both The Fossil and Paul Schippel Esq., another of Sternheim's comedies, were performed as a double-bill at the Charing Cross Theatre, London, with Alex Corbet Burcher in the title role.

An upsurge in Sternheim's popularity may occur as his plays will be out of copyright, which is standard practice after a 70-year absence since the author's death.
