= Icek Glogowski =

Nazi collaborator in World War II

- Other names: Gros Jacques
- Occupation: Night porter
- Known for: Informant, Nazi collaborator

Icek (Jacques) Glogowski, nicknamed 'le gros Jacques' (Fat Jacques), was a Belgian Jew of Polish origin. Glogowski was an informant to the occupying authorities and Nazi collaborator in Belgium, responsible for the deportation of hundreds of Jews.

== Biography ==
Icek Glogowski lived in Uccle, on the rue Vanderkindere. He was a night porter in the neighbourhood close to the Brussels-North railway station. His wife, Eva Feldberg, and their three children, Elka (9 years old), Simon (7 years old), and Leon (5 years old), were arrested by the German Sicherheitspolizei on 3 September 1942 and taken to the Dossin barracks in Mechelen. They were deported to Auschwitz-Birkenau on 10 October 1942 with Transport XII and were all murdered. After the deportation of his wife and children, Glogowski began to work as a traitor and collaborator for the Sicherheitspolizei.

=== Nazi collaborator ===
Icek was identified as a collaborator by Sarah Goldberg. This would result in several assassinations attempts on him, including one by Youra Livchitz on 27 April 1943.

In the book From the Children's Home to the Gas Chamber: And how some avoided their fate by Reinier Heinsman, two Holocaust survivors describe how their families were betrayed by Icek Glogowski.

He was sentenced to death in absentia in 1947, but his fate remains unknown with speculations ranging from an escape to South America to being deported to Auschwitz in 1944.
