= Boortmeerbeek =

- Municipality
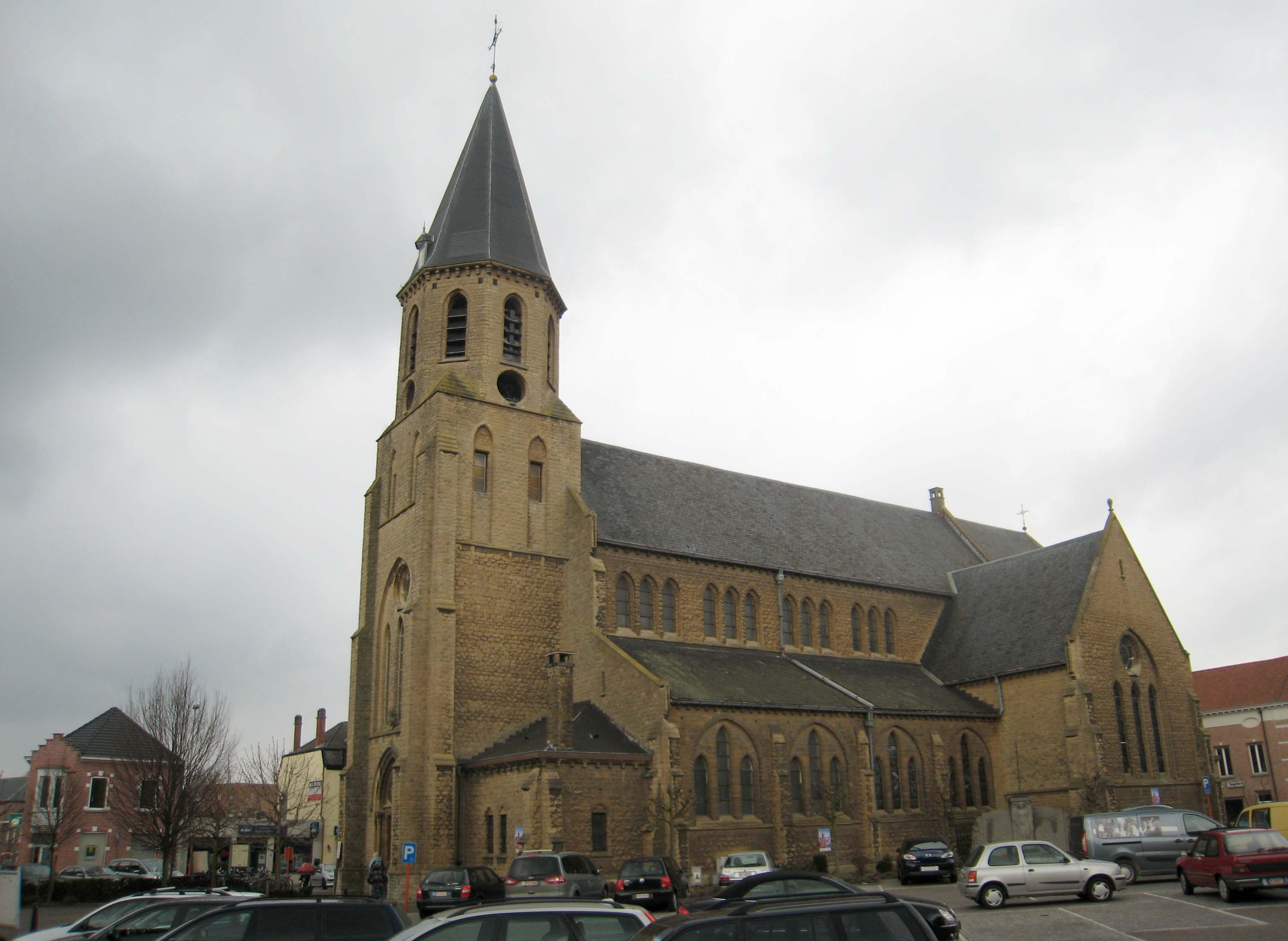
- Saint-Abtonius Church

- Flag Coat of arms

- Location of Boortmeerbeek in Flemish Brabant
- Interactive map of Boortmeerbeek
- Location in Belgium
- Coordinates: 50°59′N 04°34′E
- Country: Belgium
- Community: Flemish Community
- Region: Flemish Region
- Province: Flemish-Brabant
- Arrondissement: Leuven

Government
  - Mayor: Michel Baert (Samen voor Boortmeerbeek)
  - Governing parties: Samen Voor Boortmeerbeek, CD&V

Area
  - Total: 18.77 km^{2} (7.25 sq mi)

Population (2018-01-01)
  - Total: 12,379
  - Density: 659.5/km^{2} (1,708/sq mi)
- Demonym: Male: Boortmeerbeekenaar Female: Boortmeerbeekse Plural: Boortmeerbeekenaars
- Postal codes: 3190, 3191
- NIS code: 24014
- Area codes: 015, 016
- Website: www.boortmeerbeek.be

Boortmeerbeek (Dutch pronunciation: [ˈboːrtmeːrˌbeːk]) is a town in the Belgian province of Flemish Brabant. The municipality comprises the towns of Boortmeerbeek proper, Schiplaken and Hever. The total area is 18.64 km^{2} which gives a population density of 620 inhabitants per km^{2}.

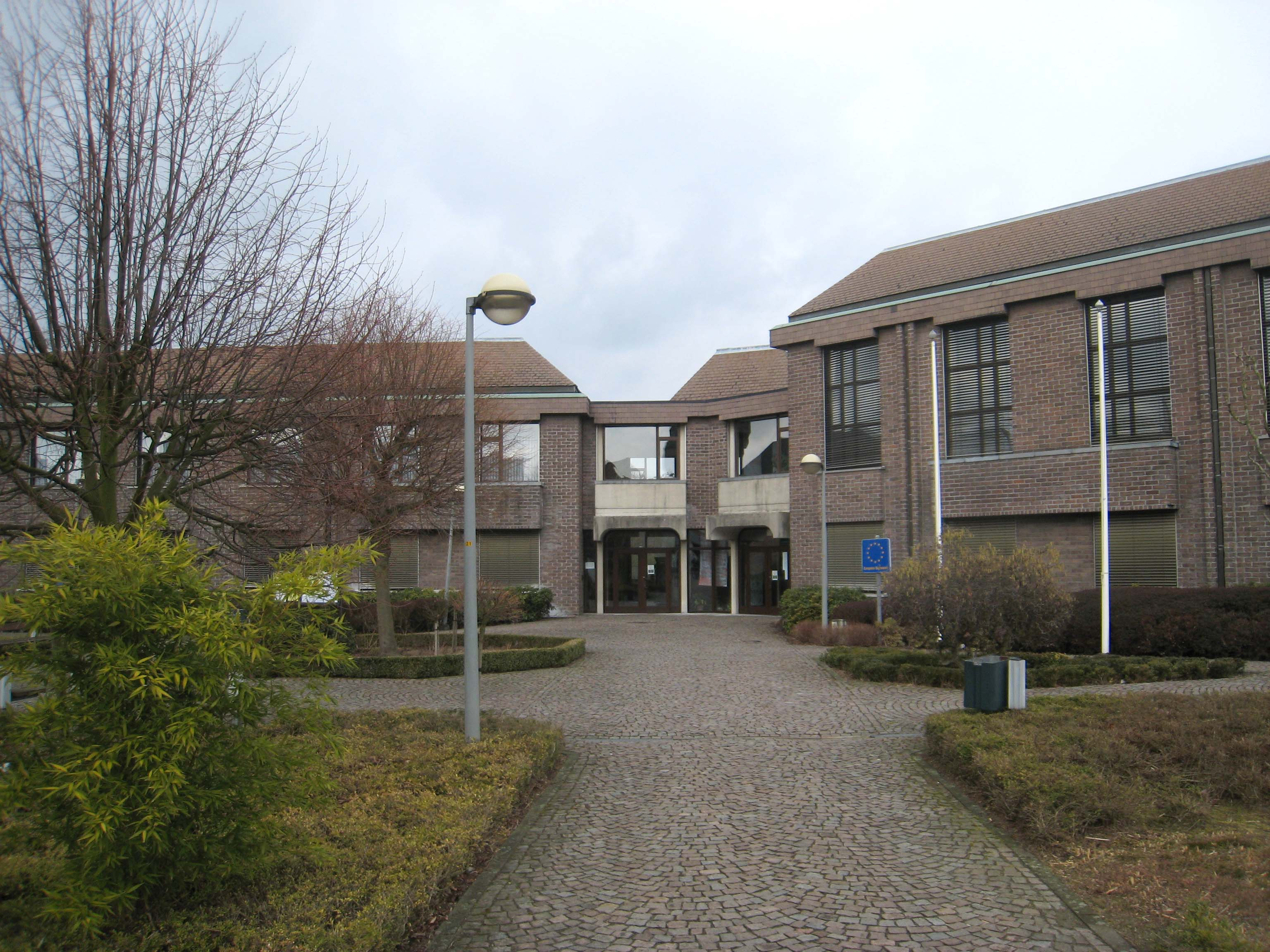
The Town Hall of Boortmeerbeek

== Sports ==
=== Football ===
BHS United is the football (soccer) team from Boortmeerbeek. It started in 2021 after a merger with KRC Boortmeerbeek and KFC Hever. Notable players from KRC Boortmeerbeek have included Albert Cluytens and Danny Lenie and Michel Verschueren. Michel Verschueren was born in 1931 in Boortmeerbeek, his career in football began at KRC Boortmeerbeek. After his career ended, he became coach of the club for the season 56'-57' and 57'-58'.

== Related people ==
- Jan van Muysen, who built the Saint. Abtonius-church in 1451. It got rebuilt after it was destroyed by the german invasion on belgium in WWI
- Charles de Santa Cruz; knight, lord of Boortmeerbeek; married to Susanne de Molenare.
  - Juan Franscisco de Santa Cruz, Lord of Boortmeerbeek, married to Marie Antoinette Baltine Tucher.

== See also ==
- Twentieth convoy
