= Robert Maistriau =

Righteous Among the Nations

Robert Maistriau (March 13, 1921 – September 26, 2008) was an active member of the Belgian Resistance and was recognized as a Righteous Among the Nations from Belgium. Maistriau is known for his part in an operation against a deportation train to Auschwitz.

== Early life ==
Maistriau was born in Woluwe-Saint-Lambert on March 13, 1921. His father was a military doctor during World War I. In 1939, when he was 18, he started to study medicine. At age 22, Maistriau decided to join a Belgian resistance group called “Comité de Défense des Juifs”.

== Activity during WWII ==
On April 19, 1943, Maistriau and two other members of the resistance - Jean Franklemon (fr) and Maistriau’s childhood friend, Youra Livchitz (fr), executed a plan to rescue Jews from the twentieth transport. They did so by stopping the train using a hurricane lamp covered in red silk paper at around half past nine at night, while it was dark outside. The driver of the train was tricked by the red light and stopped the train. One of them used a pistol to menace the train driver while the other two were trying to open the wagons. Maistriau managed to open one of them and he convinced several people who were there to jump out of the wagon. Then, he handed out money bills of 50 Francs to some of the Jews. As the fleeing people ran for cover, the Germans shot at them from every direction, killing 23 people and harming several others. In total, 231 Jews jumped out of the train and 17 of them fled owing to the help of the underground members. This operation is the only successful attack on a Jewish deportation train in Europe.

== Honors ==
The rescue event was marked in Belgium in 1993, by having a ceremony located where the operation took place. Representatives of the Jewish community and the king of Belgium were present there. On June 3, 1993, soon after the ceremony, Radio Judaica applied for recognition of Maistriau as a Righteous Among the Nations.

On August 31, 1994, Yad Vashem granted Maistriau the Righteous Among the Nations honorific.

In 2005, Free University of Brussels granted him an Honorary degree. Woluwe-Saint-Lambert, his hometown, granted him honorable citizenship and named a public garden after him.
