= Youra Livchitz =

Jewish Belgian doctor

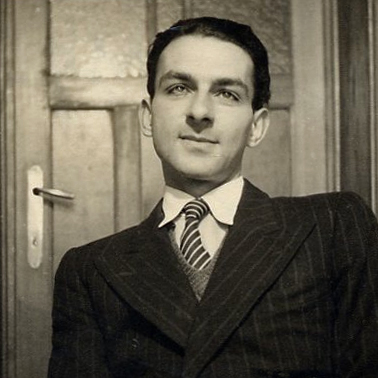
- ca. 1943
- Born: September 17, 1918; Kiev, Russian Empire
- Died: February 17, 1944 (aged 26); Schaerbeek, Belgium
- Cause of death: Firing Squad
- Alma mater: Free University of Brussels
- Relatives: His brother Alexandre was also a Resistance combatant
- Military career
- Allegiance: Partisans Armés
- Nickname: Georges
- Known for: Attack on the twentieth convoy
- Conflicts: World War 2

Youra 'Georges' Livchitz (September 17, 1918 – February 17, 1944) was a young Jewish doctor who was a member of the Belgian Resistance and was one of three members who attacked a Nazi convoy to free Jews on a Holocaust train.

== Biography ==
Livchitz's parents were Jewish immigrants from Kishinev, then part of the Russian Empire, who had moved to Munich in 1910, where they had his older brother Alexnadre. His father would then graduate from medical school in 1913. World War I would then drive his family to Kiev, where they had Youra on September 17, 1918.

In 1928, Livchitz's parents separated and soon after his mother brought the two sons to Brussels, Belgium. His mother became engrossed in theosophy circles and joined intellectual circles, which were also frequented by his younger friends and future comrades Jean Franklemon and Robert Maistriau. It was in these circles that Youra would become connected with several left wing intellectuals before graduating from Free University of Brussels with a degree in medicine.

Prior to World War II, Livchitz was a representative for the Belgian pharmaceutical company Pharmacobel. He would retain work with them up until his arrest. He would be a regular at the parties of Marcel Hastir, due in part to the Livchitz brothers sitting as models for the artist on occasion.

=== World War II ===
By 1942, Livchitz had become active in the Belgian resistance movement and was affiliated with the Front de l'Indépendance. He began teaching underground courses and secretly publishing a war journal, these activities would introduce him to his lover, Jacqueline Mondo. His friend Marcel Hastir, had gained permission from the Germans to open a workshop in 1940, but this was a front for harboring Jews and facilitating a meeting place for Belgian resistance members; the Livchitz brothers used its cellar to print their anti-Nazi leaflets on Hastir's roneo machine.

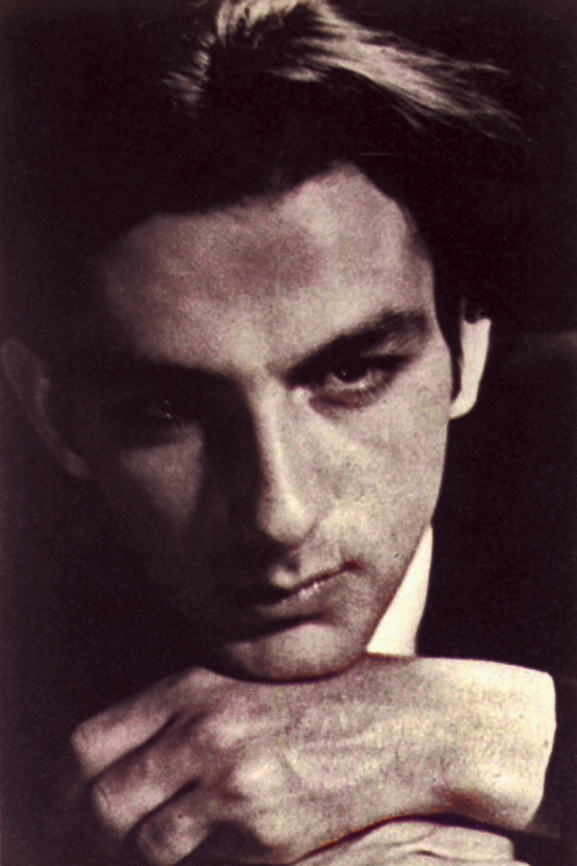
ca. pre 1943

Leading up to the attack on the train, Livchitz's older brother Alexandre, a member of the Partisans Armés, had suffered two gunshot wounds while attempting to assassinate a high level Nazi collaborator.

On April 19, 1943, Youra Georges Livchitz, along with his two Belgian friends, Jean Franklemon and Robert Maistriau, attacked a train of cattle cars full of Jews headed for Auschwitz with 1,631 Jews aboard, being the only attack against the deportation trains in the entirety of the war. The group selected an area that was outside of the city but within biking distance, their leader Livchitz ensuring that they would have the cover of night to assist them. By reaching out to childhood friends, Livchitz was able to contact Groupe G and receive a Browning Model 1906 for the mission. They stopped the train by the station in Boortmeerbeek from Mechelen placing a red piece of paper over a hurricane lamp to simulate a red signal lantern in front of the rails and then, armed with pliers and a pistol, broke into one of the stock cars. Livchitz held the train engineer at gunpoint while his two compatriots went to free the captives. 231 people were able to get out of the stock car while getting fired upon, 115 of these people successfully escaped. After a brief shooting battle between the German train guards and the three Resistance members, the train started again.

After the attack on the train, Livchitz stayed with Jacqueline Mondo's parents while recovering from a gunshot wound he sustained during the attack. During this period, on April 27, 1943, Livchitz attempted to assassinate the Nazi collaborator Icek Glogowski, a man who had sent hundreds of his fellow Jews to be liquidated, but failed due to his gun jamming. Worried for his associates, on account of increasing police scrutiny, he tried warning his teammates; but the man who was sent to pass the information on, Pierre Romanovitch, was actually an informer for the Gestapo. He and his hosts, who were also members of the resistance, were arrested a month after the train attack on May 14, 1943.

While imprisoned, Livchitz was able to escape the Gestapo headquarters by overpowering his guard and stealing his uniform. This new freedom was short lived, as he and his older brother were arrested on June 26, 1943 by the Feldgendarmerie as they were planning to cross to England. They had made arrangements to sneak out of the country via a delivery truck headed to France. Their arrest was the result of another betrayal as their driver brought them directly to the Gestapo.

Both of the Livchitz brothers were imprisoned and sentenced to execution, Alexandre on account of attempting to kill a Nazi police chief and Youra due for various resistance activities. Both brothers wrote letters to their mother while imprisoned, after being sentenced to execution. Both brothers wrote of their lack of fear in the face of execution.

Livchitz, refusing to wear a blindfold, was executed by firing squad on February 17, 1944 at Schaerbeek's National Shooting Range. He was executed a week after his brother had been killed by the firing squad.

== Legacy ==
Livchitz and his compatriots were memorialized at the Bois de la Cambre with their names placed on plaques as part of a Holocaust memorial on January 27, 2023. The main plaque of their memorial was defaced a year later with a swastika as part of a wave of antisemitic attacks and incidents in 2024.
