= Attack on the twentieth convoy =

1943 freeing of Jews from a Holocaust train

Coordinates: 50.9820°N 4.5737°E

Attack on the Twentieth Convoy to Auschwitz
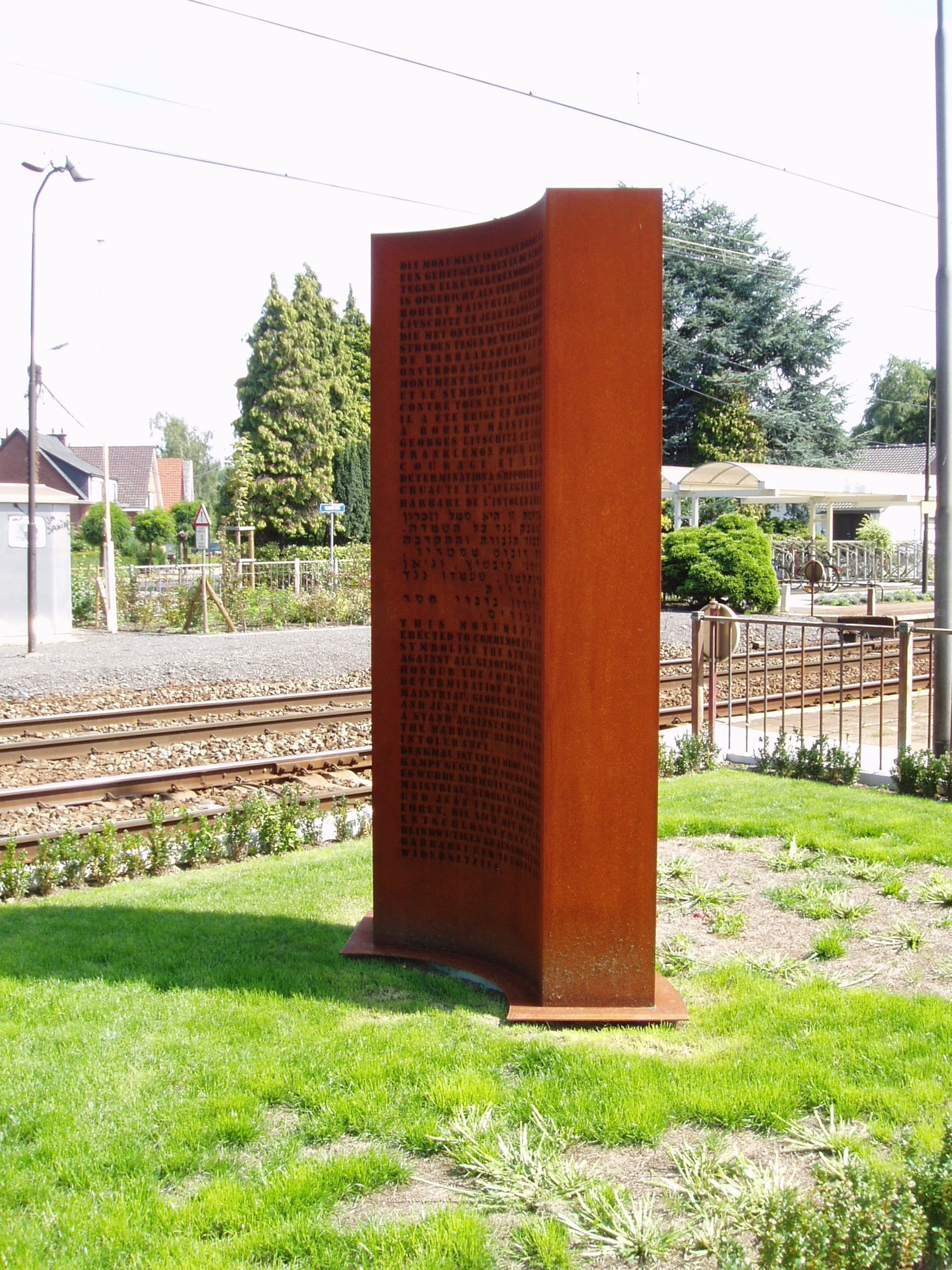
- Memorial to the attack
- Location: Between Boortmeerbeek and Haacht, Belgium
- Date: 19 April 1943
- Incident type: Sabotage, mass prisoner escape
- Perpetrators: Belgian Resistance
- Survivors: 118 escapees, 153 Auschwitz survivors
- Memorials: Yes

On 19 April 1943, members of the Belgian Resistance stopped a Holocaust train and freed a number of Jews who were being transported to Auschwitz concentration camp from Mechelen transit camp in Belgium, on the twentieth convoy from the camp. In the aftermath of the attack, a number of other captives were able to jump from the train as well. In all, 233 people managed to escape, of whom 118 ultimately survived. The remainder were either killed during the escape or were recaptured soon afterwards. The attack was unusual as an attempt by the resistance to free Jewish deportees and marks the only mass breakout by deportees on a Holocaust train.

== Background ==
Between 70,000 and 75,000 Jews were living in Belgium in 1940. Few were long-term residents and many entered the country during the interwar period to flee persecution in Germany and Eastern Europe. Soon after the German invasion of Belgium in May 1940, the German occupation authorities introduced a number of anti-Jewish laws. In 1942, the yellow badge was introduced for all Belgian Jews. In August 1942, as part of the Final Solution, the deportation of Belgian Jews to concentration and extermination camps in Eastern Europe in sealed railway convoys began.

Of these, 46 percent were deported from the former Mechelen transit camp (also known as the Dossin barracks), while 5,034 more people were deported via the Drancy internment camp (close to Paris). The Reichssicherheitshauptamt (RSHA) in Berlin was responsible for organizing the transport and the chief of the Dossin Barracks (Sammellager) prepared the paper convoy list in triplicate. One copy was for the police officer in charge of security during the transport, the second for the Sammellager in Mechelen and the third for the BSD-department located in Brussels. Because all the copies for the Dossin Barracks were preserved, historians have been able to trace and map all the German transports of Belgian Jews to the concentration camps. From the summer of 1942 until 1944, twenty-eight transports left Belgium to bring 25,257 Jews and 351 Roma to Eastern Europe. Their destination was usually Auschwitz-Birkenau.

== Attack ==
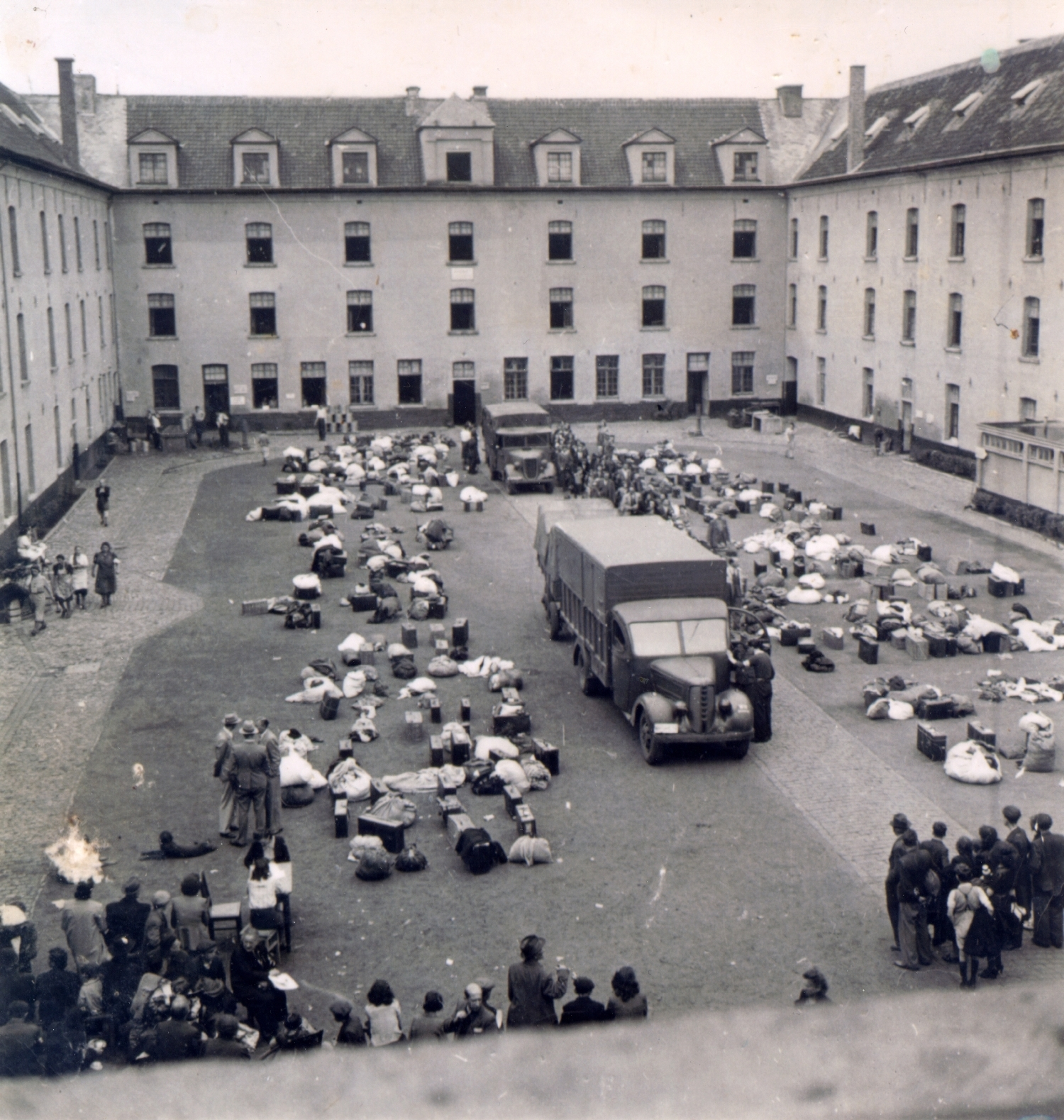
German trucks leave the Dossin Barracks

On 19 April 1943, the twentieth transport left Mechelen transit camp carrying 1,631 Jewish men, women, and children. For the first time, the third-class carriages previously used were replaced by freight wagons with barbed wire covering the small windows. A special wagon, Sonderwagen, was added with 19 Jews (18 men and one woman) consisting of resistance members and "jumpers" from previous transports. These "special list" prisoners were marked on the back of their clothes with a cross painted in red so that guards would know to execute them immediately on arrival at Auschwitz. Eventually, three prisoners escaped from the wagon; a fourth was shot.

Three young students and members of the Belgian resistance including a Jewish doctor, Youra Livchitz and his two non-Jewish friends Robert Maistriau (Note: Robert Maistriau – his activity to save Jews' lives during the Holocaust, at Yad Vashem website) and Jean Franklemon, armed with one pistol, a lantern, and red paper to create a makeshift red lantern (to use as a danger signal), were able to stop the train on the track Mechelen-Leuven, between the municipalities of Boortmeerbeek and Haacht. The twentieth convoy was guarded by one officer and fifteen men from the Sicherheitspolizei (SiPo-SD), who came from Germany. Despite these security measures, Maistriau was able to open one wagon and liberate 17 people.

Other prisoners escaped from the convoy without any connection with the attack. The train driver, Albert Dumon, did all he could to keep the slowest pace between Tienen and Tongeren, stopping whenever it was possible and justifiable, and so allow that more people could jump without killing themselves.

In all, 233 people succeeded in escaping from the train. 89 were eventually recaptured and put on later convoys. 26 others were killed, either by shooting or by the fall, and 118 who succeeded in escaping. The youngest, Simon Gronowski, was only 11 years old. Régine Krochmal, an eighteen-year-old nurse with the resistance, also escaped after she cut the wooden bars put in front of the train air inlet with a bread knife and jumped from the train near Haacht. Both survived the war.

== Later journey ==
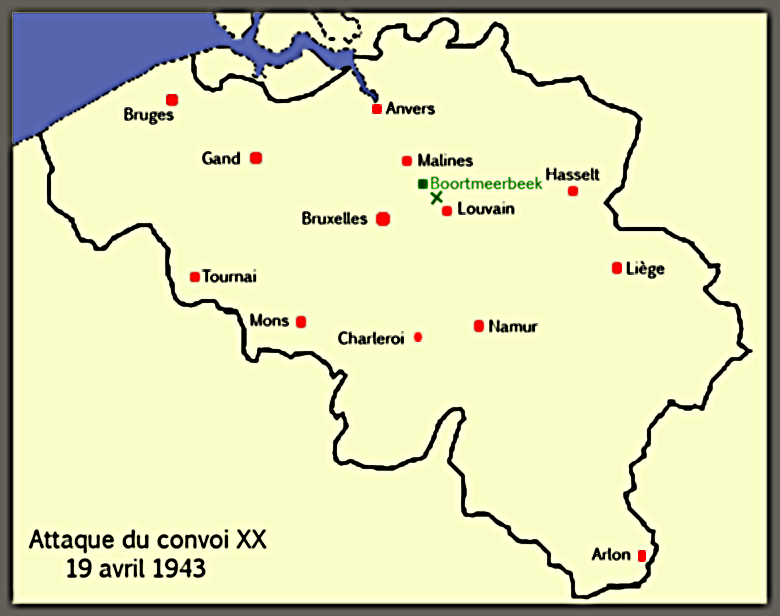
The site of the attack on the convoy within Belgium

On 22 April 1943, the train arrived at Auschwitz. During the selection, only 521 ID numbers (276 men and 245 women) were assigned as slave laborers, and only 150 of the 521 ultimately survived the war. The remaining 874 non-selected people were immediately murdered in the gas chambers of Auschwitz II-Birkenau. It is believed that, as a result of the escape, an unusually large proportion of the prisoners from the convoy were killed on arrival. As many as 70 percent of the female prisoners were killed immediately in the gas chambers, while the rest were assigned for medical experimentation.

== Aftermath ==
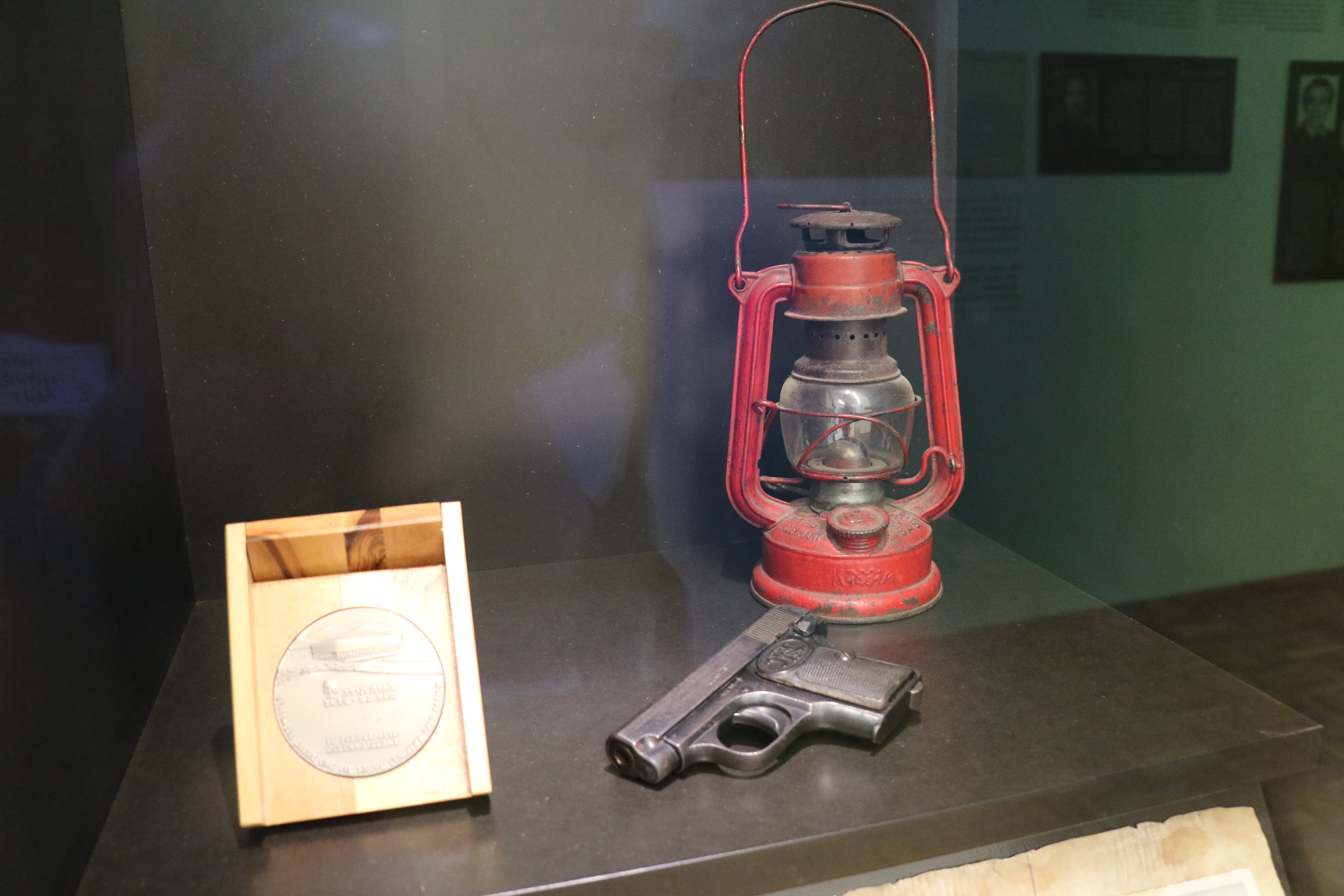
Items used during the attack, now in the collection of the Kazerne Dossin Museum in Belgium

The attack was unusual as an attempt by the resistance to free Jewish deportees and marks the only mass breakout by deportees.

The twentieth convoy was an exceptionally large convoy and was the first transport to use freight cars with doors fenced with barbed-wire. The previous transports used third-class wagons on which it was easy to escape through the windows. After the twentieth convoy, each convoy was reinforced with a German reserve company (based in Brussels) until it reached the German border.

The three resistance members who executed the raid met the following fates:

- Youra Livchitz (1917–1944): A month after the raid on the convoy, Livchitz was arrested by the Gestapo. He managed to overpower his guard, put on his uniform and escape from Gestapo headquarters in Brussels. On 26 June 1943, Livchitz and his brother Alexander were stopped by the Feldgendarmerie. Weapons were found in the car and the two were arrested. On 17 February 1944, Youra Livchitz was executed by firing squad in Schaerbeek.
- Jean Franklemon (1917–1977): Franklemon was arrested on 4 August 1943, and imprisoned at Fort Breendonk. On 14 March 1944, a German court-martial sentenced him to six years imprisonment. In April 1944, he was transported to Sonnenburg concentration camp as a Nacht und Nebel prisoner. In November 1944, he was moved to Sachsenhausen concentration camp. After the liberation, Franklemon remained in Germany where he died in 1977.
- Robert Maistriau (1921–2008): After the raid on the convoy, Maistriau fled to the Ardennes forest, where he hid with the partisans for seven months. He took part in La Grande Coupure, a resistance action which on 15 January 1944, destroyed 20 electricity pylons. On 20 March 1944, Maistriau was arrested by the Sicherheitspolizei. He was held at Fort Breendonk before being transported to Buchenwald concentration camp. After further periods in concentration camps near Harzungen (a subcamp of Mittelbau-Dora) and Elrich, he was moved to Bergen-Belsen, where he was liberated on 15 April 1945. He moved to the Belgian Congo in 1949. He died in 2008 in Woluwe-Saint-Lambert (Brussels).

In remembrance of the action of the resistance, a statue was inaugurated in 1993 near the train station of Boortmeerbeek. It remembers the Holocaust and the transport of 25,483 Jews and 351 Roma over the railway track Mechelen-Leuven to the concentration camps.

== Citations ==
=== Sources ===
- Saerens, Lieven (1998). "Antwerp's Attitudes towards the Jews from 1918 to 1940 and its Implications for the Period of Occupation". In Michman, Dan (ed.). Belgium and the Holocaust: Jews, Belgians, Germans (2nd ed.). Jerusalem: Yad Vashem. ISBN 965-308-068-7.
- Williams, Althea; Ehrlich, Sarah (19 April 2013). "Escaping the train to Auschwitz". BBC News.
- Yahil, Leni (1991). The Holocaust: The Fate of European Jewry, 1932–1945. Studies in Jewish History (Reprint (trans.) ed.). Oxford: Oxford University Press. ISBN 0-19-504523-8.
