= Judenfrei =

Nazi term referring to areas that are "free/clean of Jews"

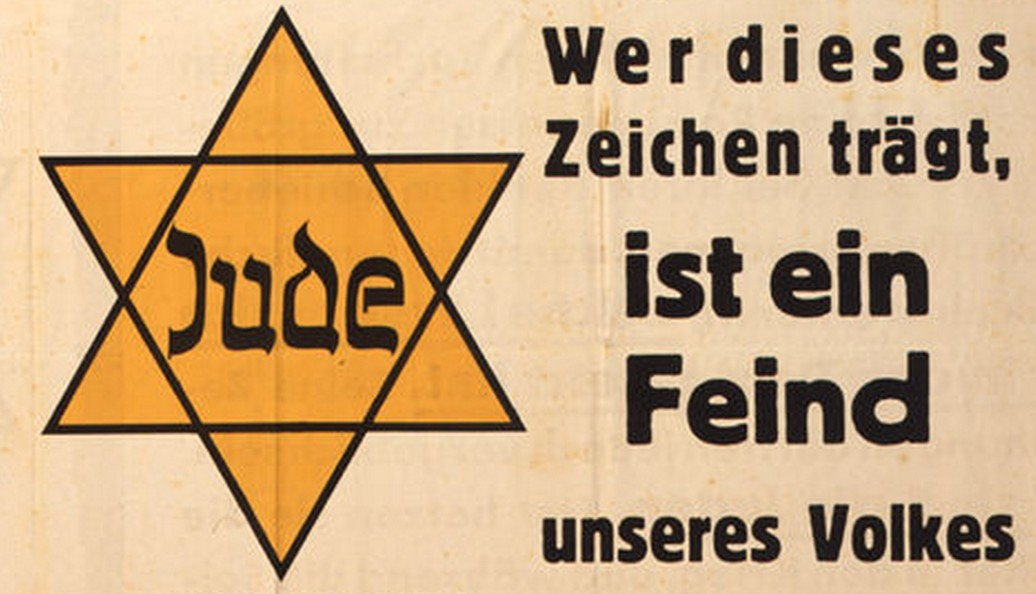
"Whoever wears this sign is an enemy of our people" – Parole der Woche, 1 July 1942 showing a yellow badge used by the Nazis to identify Jews

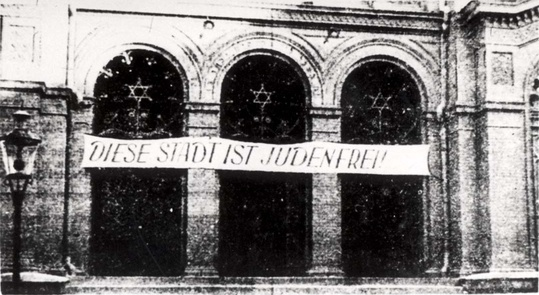
Synagogue in German-occupied Bydgoszcz, Poland, September 1939. The inscription in German reads: "This city is free of Jews!"

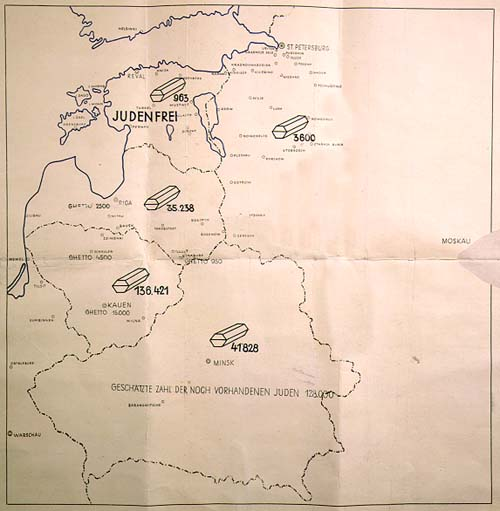
German map showing the number of Jewish executions carried out by Einsatzgruppe A in: Estonia (declared judenfrei), Latvia, Lithuania, Belarus, and Russia

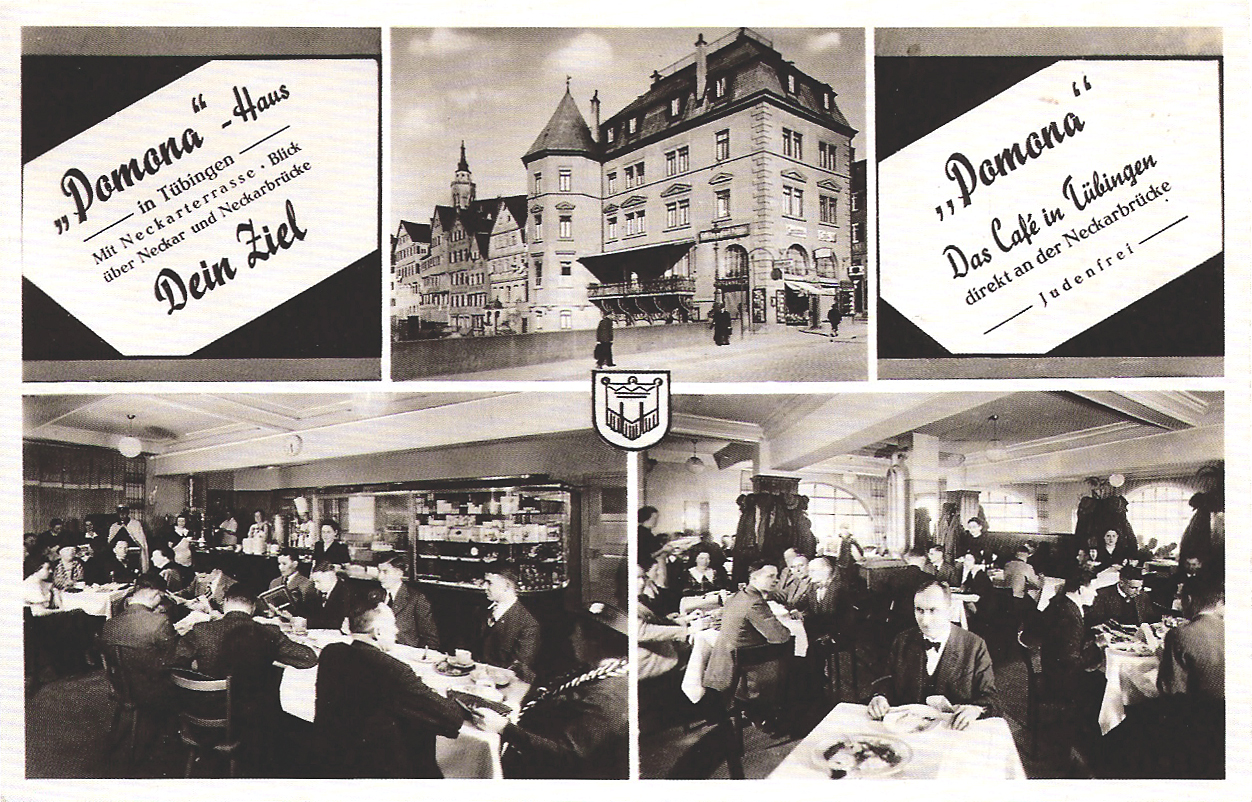
Advertisement for a café in Tübingen, describing itself as judenfrei

Judenfrei (German: [ˈjuːdn̩ˌfʁaɪ], "free of Jews") and judenrein (German: [ˈjuːdn̩ˌʁaɪn], "clean of Jews") are terms of Nazi origin to designate an area that has been "cleansed" of Jews during the Holocaust. While judenfrei refers merely to "freeing" an area of all of its Jewish inhabitants, the term judenrein (literally "clean of Jews") has the even stronger connotation that any trace of Jewish blood had been removed as an alleged impurity in the minds of Nazis. These terms of racial discrimination and racial abuse are intrinsic to Nazi antisemitism and were used by the Nazis in Germany before World War II and in occupied countries such as Poland in 1939. Judenfrei describes the local Jewish population having been removed from a town, region, or country by forced evacuation during the Holocaust, though many Jews were hidden by local people. Removal methods included forced re-housing in Nazi ghettos especially in eastern Europe, and forced removal or resettlement to the East by German troops, often to their deaths. Most Jews were identified from late 1941 by the yellow badge as a result of pressure from Joseph Goebbels and Heinrich Himmler.

Following the defeat of Germany in 1945, some attempts have been made to attract Jewish people back to Germany, as well as reconstruct synagogues destroyed during and after Kristallnacht.

== Locations declared judenfrei ==
Establishments, villages, cities, and regions were declared judenfrei or judenrein after they were apparently cleared of Jews. However, some Jewish people survived by being hidden and sheltered by friendly neighbours. In Berlin, they were known as "submariners" since they seemed to have disappeared (under the waves). Many survived the end of the war, hence becoming Holocaust survivors.

- Gelnhausen, Germany and Calw, Germany – reported judenfrei on November 1, 1938, by propaganda newspaper Kinzigwacht after their synagogues were closed and remaining local Jews forced to leave the towns.
- German-occupied Bydgoszcz (Poland) – reported judenfrei in December 1939.
- German-annexed Alsace – reported judenrein by Robert Heinrich Wagner in July 1940.
- Tuszyn, near Lodz, was declared judenfrei by March 1941.
- The city of Kiev was declared judenrein on September 29, 1941.
- Banat, German-occupied territory of Serbia – reported judenfrei on 19 August 1941 in Völkische Beobachter (lit. People's Observer). On 20 August 1941 Banat was declared judenfrei by its German administrators.
- German-occupied Luxembourg – reported judenfrei by the press on October 17, 1941.
- German-occupied Estonia – December 1941. Reported as judenfrei at the Wannsee Conference on January 20, 1942.
- Bessarabia was declared judenrein in January 1942 by Romanian officials, although Nazi officials deemed Bessarabia judenrein in June 1942.
- Independent State of Croatia – Declared judenfrei by Interior Minister Andrija Artuković in February 1942 but Germany suspected that this was not true and the authorities from Berlin sent Franz Abromeit to assess the situation. After that, the Ustaše were under pressure to finish the job. In April 1942 two hundred Jews from Osijek were deported to Jasenovac, while 2,800 were sent to Auschwitz. The Gestapo organized the deportation to Auschwitz of the last Croatian Jews in May 1943, 1,700 from Zagreb and 2,500 from other parts of the NDH. German diplomat Siegfried Kasche pronounced Croatia judenfrei in a message to Berlin on 18 April 1944, stating that "Croatia is one of the countries in which the Jewish problem has been solved".
- The Polish city of Zgierz, near Lodz, was made judenrein in February 1942.
- German-occupied territory of Serbia / Belgrade – May 1942, reported in the SS-Standartenführer Emanuel Schäfer cable sent to the Reich Security Main Office in Berlin; Schäfer was the Der Befehlshaber der SIPO und des SD head at that time in Belgrade, while in June 1942 he reported to his supervisors that "Serbien ist Judenfrei" (lit. "Serbia is free of Jews"). In August 1942, Harald Turner reported to the German commander in the Balkans that Serbia was the first European territory where the "Jewish problem" was solved.
- In July 1942, Frankfurt was declared judenrein.
- Vienna – reported judenfrei by Alois Brunner on October 9, 1942.
- The Nazis deemed Sosnowiec, Poland to be judenrein in December 1942.
- In February 1943, the Czechoslovak Government-in-Exile reported that the last few remaining Jews had been deported by the Nazis from the Czech towns of Mělník and Mladá Boleslav rendering them judenrein.
- In March 1943, the Polish city of Kowel was rendered judenrein.
- Berlin, Germany – May 19, 1943.
- Erlangen, Germany was declared judenfrei in 1944.

== See also ==
- Armenia without Armenians
- History of the Jews in Germany
