= Resettlement =

Resettlement may refer to:

- Population transfer, movement of a large group of people from one region to another
- Refugee resettlement, a voluntary UN Refugee Agency program
- Resettlement Administration, a New Deal federal agency
- Resettlement Department, a department of the Hong Kong government
- Resettlement (Newfoundland), an approach to centralize the population into growth areas
- Resettlement to the East, a Nazi euphemism used to refer to the deportation of Jews to extermination camps
- Indian removal, a United States government policy of forced displacement of Native Americans tribes from their ancestral homelands
