= Holocaust trains =

Railway transports used in Nazi Germany

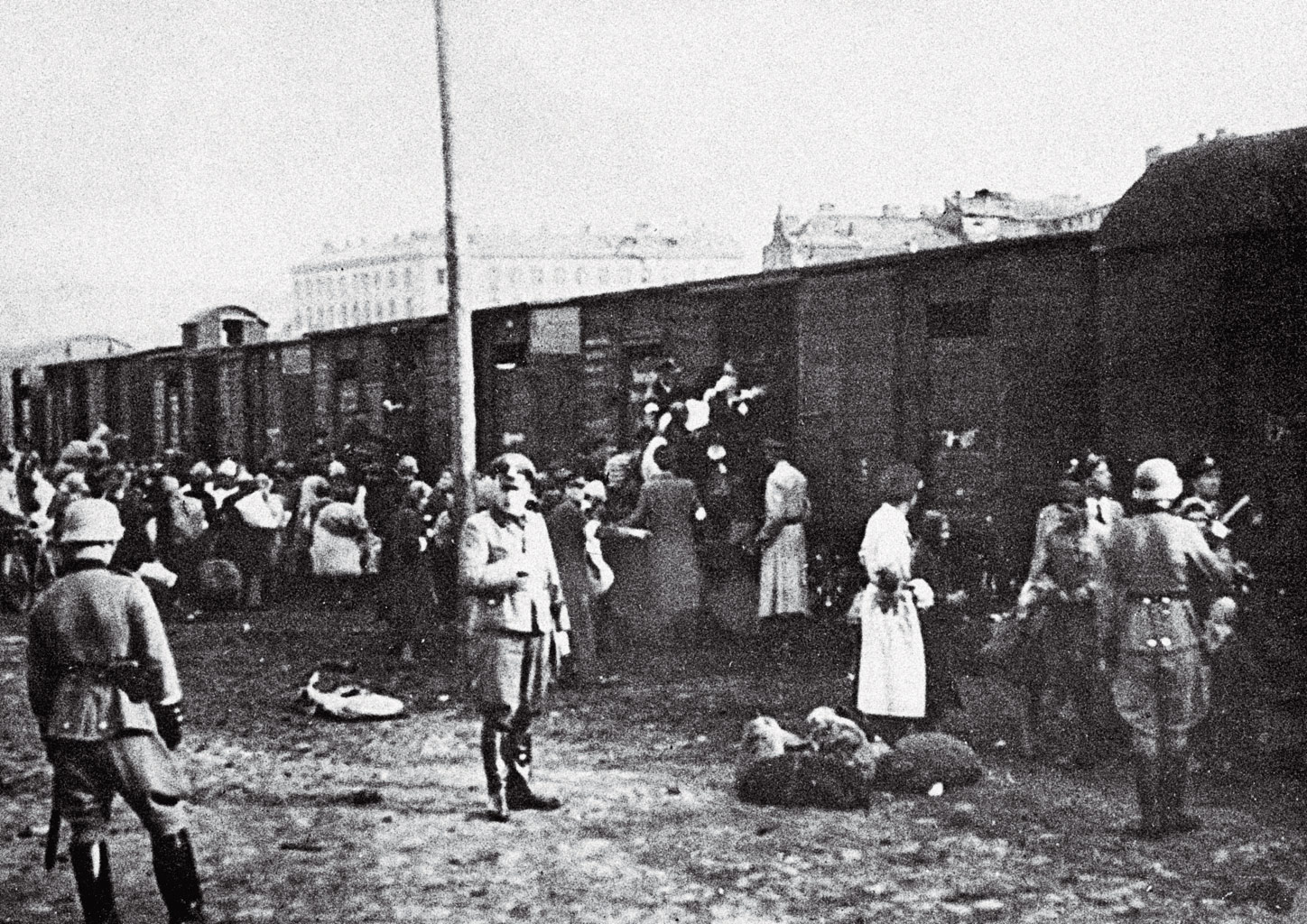
- Polish Jews being loaded onto trains at Umschlagplatz of the Warsaw Ghetto, 1942.

Operation
- Period: 1941–1944
- Location: Nazi Germany, German-occupied Europe, Axis countries in Europe

Prisoner victims
- Destination: Transit ghettos, Nazi concentration camps, forced labour and extermination camps

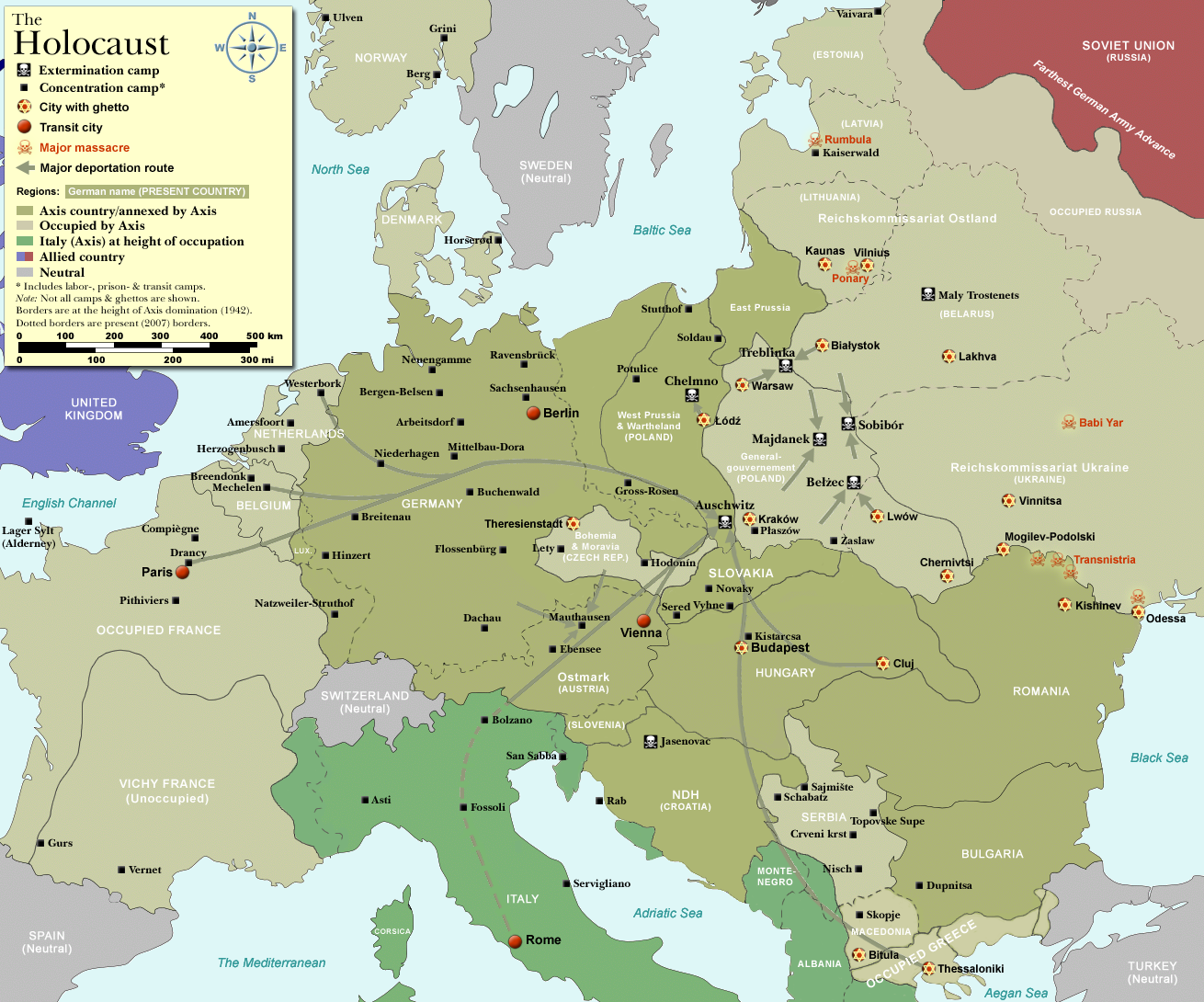
General map of deportation routes and camps

Holocaust trains were railway transports run by the Deutsche Reichsbahn and other European railways under the control of Nazi Germany and its allies, for the purpose of forcible deportation of the Jews, as well as other victims of the Holocaust, to the Nazi concentration, forced labour, and extermination camps.

The speed at which people targeted in the "Final Solution" could be exterminated was dependent on two factors: the capacity of the death camps to gas the victims and quickly dispose of their bodies, as well as the capacity of the railways to transport the victims from Nazi ghettos to extermination camps. The most modern accurate numbers on the scale of the "Final Solution" still rely partly on shipping records of the German railways.

== Pre-war ==
The first mass deportation of Jews from Nazi Germany, the Polenaktion, occurred in October 1938. It was the forcible eviction of German Jews with Polish citizenship fuelled by the Kristallnacht. Approximately 30,000 Jews were rounded up and sent via rail to refugee camps.

== Role of railways in the Final Solution ==
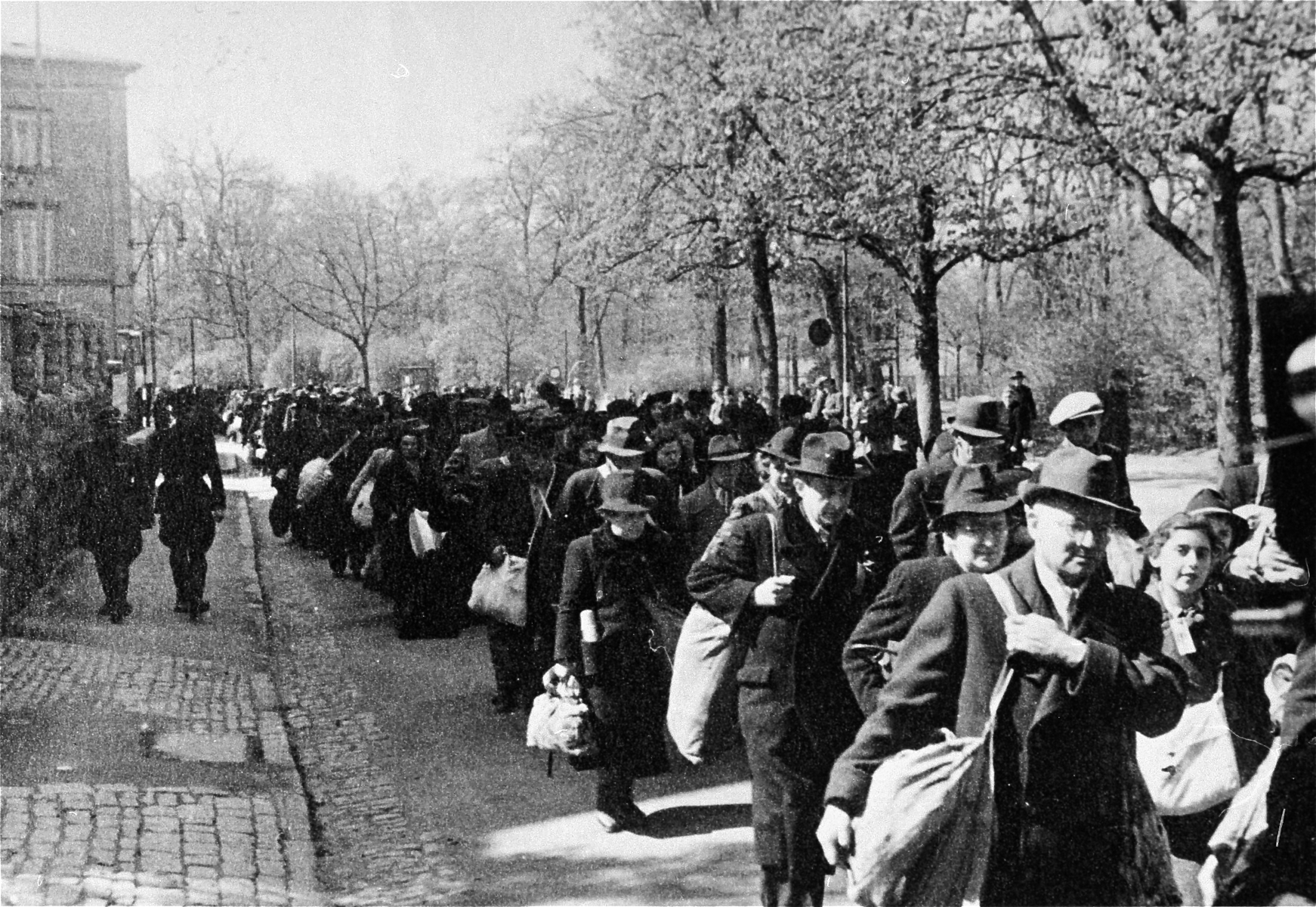
Jews are deported from Würzburg, 25 April 1942. Deportation occurred in public and was witnessed by many Germans.

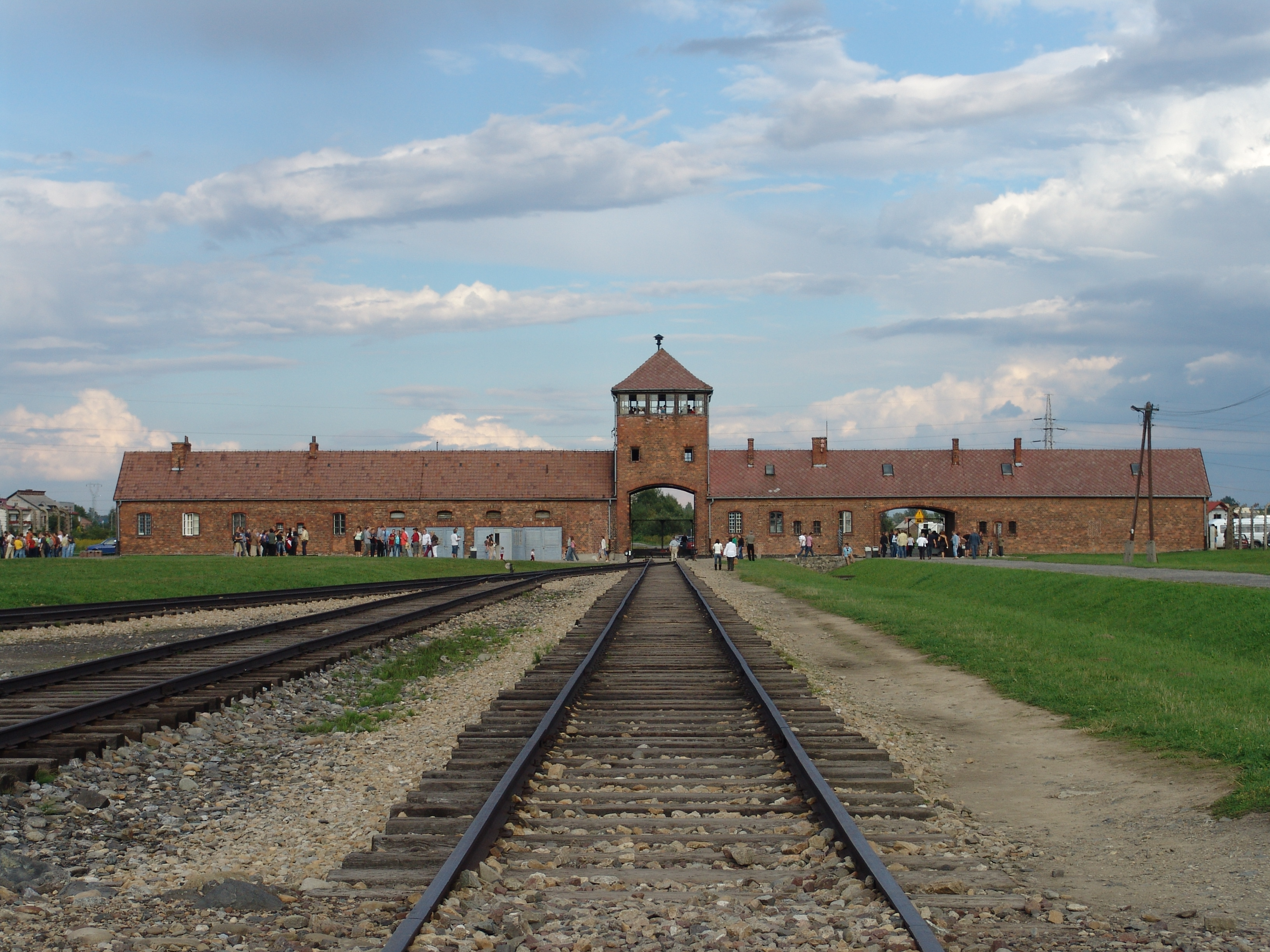
The "Gate of Death" at Auschwitz-Birkenau was built in 1943.

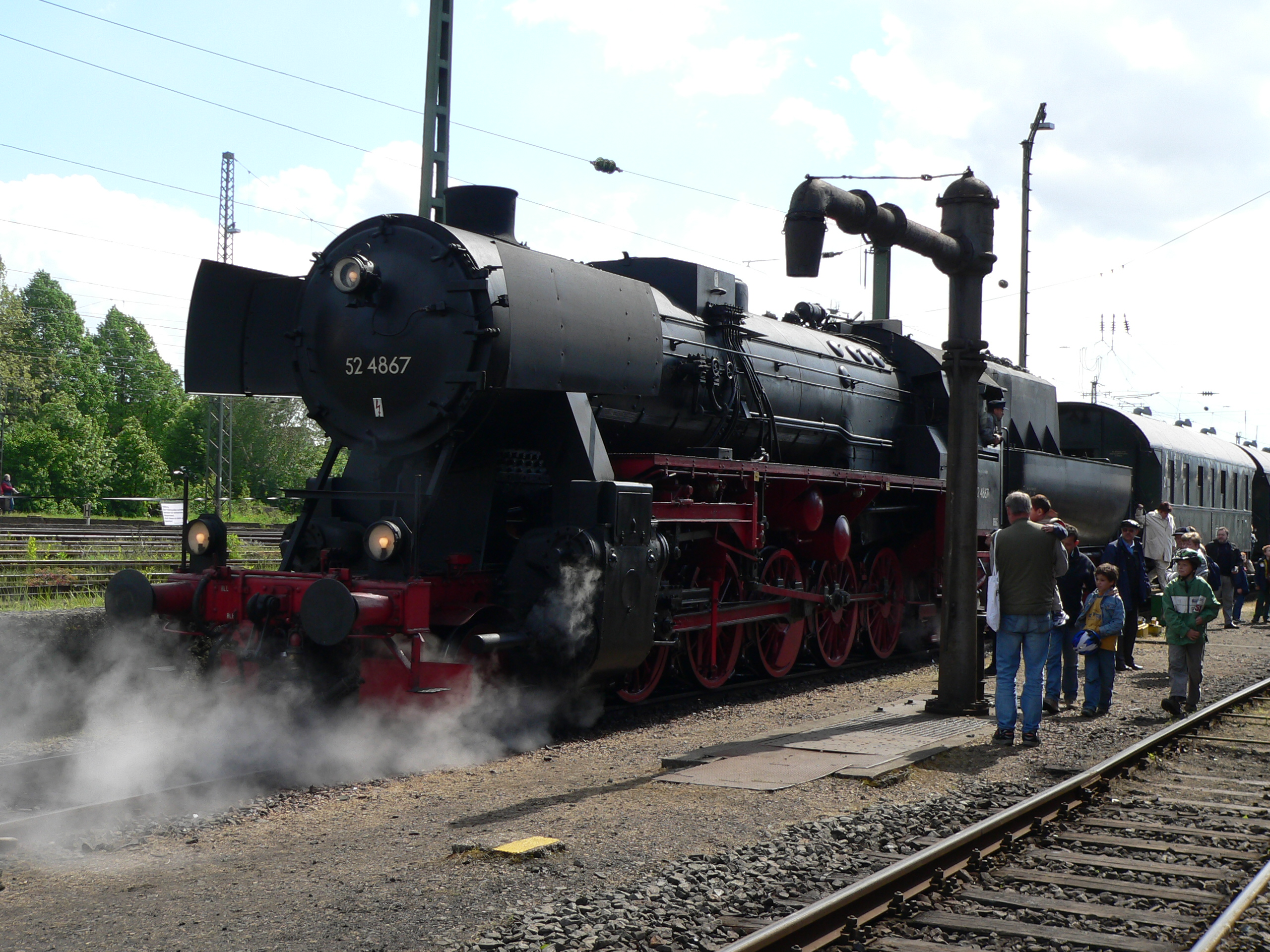
German-made DRB Class 52 steam locomotive used by the Deutsche Reichsbahn during World War II. Members of this class were used in the Holocaust.

Within various phases of the Holocaust, the trains were employed differently. At first, they were used to concentrate the Jewish populations in the ghettos, and often to transport them to forced labour and German concentration camps for the purpose of economic exploitation. In 1939, for logistical reasons, the Jewish communities in settlements without railway lines in occupied Poland were dissolved. By the end of 1941, about 3.5 million Polish Jews had been segregated and ghettoised by the SS in a massive deportation action involving the use of freight trains. Permanent ghettos had direct railway connections because the food aid (paid for by Jews themselves) was completely dependent on the SS, similar to all newly built labour camps. Jews were legally banned from baking bread. They were sealed off from the general public in hundreds of virtual prison-islands called Jüdische Wohnbezirke or Wohngebiete der Juden. However, the new system was unsustainable. By the end of 1941, most ghettoised Jews had no savings left to pay the SS for further bulk food deliveries. The quagmire was resolved at the Wannsee Conference of 20 January 1942 near Berlin, where the "Final Solution of the Jewish question" (die Endlösung der Judenfrage) was set in place. It was a euphemism referring to the Nazi plan for the annihilation of the Jewish people.

During the liquidation of the ghettos starting in 1942, the trains were used to transport the condemned populations to death camps. To implement the "Final Solution", the Nazis made the Deutsche Reichsbahn an indispensable element of the mass extermination machine, wrote historian Raul Hilberg.

The Nazis disguised their "Final Solution" as the mass "resettlement to the east". The victims were told they were being taken to labour camps in Reichskommissariat Ukraine. In reality, from 1942 on, for most Jews, deportations meant being murdered at either Bełżec, Chełmno, Sobibór, Majdanek, Treblinka, or Auschwitz-Birkenau. The plan was being realized in the utmost secrecy. In late 1942, during a telephone conversation, Hitler's private secretary Martin Bormann admonished Heinrich Himmler, who was informing him about 50,000 Jews already exterminated in a concentration camp in Poland. "They were not exterminated – Bormann screamed – only evacuated, evacuated, evacuated!", and slammed down the phone, wrote Enghelberg.

Following the Wannsee Conference of 1942, the Nazis began to murder Jews in large numbers at death camps, newly built as part of Operation Reinhard. Since 1941, the Einsatzgruppen, mobile extermination squads, were already conducting mass shootings of Jews in Eastern Europe. The Jews of Western Europe were either deported to ghettos emptied through mass killings, such as the Rumbula massacre of the inhabitants of the Riga Ghetto, or sent directly to Treblinka, Belzec, and Sobibór, extermination camps built in spring and summer of 1942 only for gassing. Auschwitz II Birkenau gas chambers began operating in March. The last death camp, Majdanek, began operating gas chambers in late 1942.

At Wannsee, the SS estimated that the "Final Solution" could ultimately eradicate up to 11 million European Jews; Nazi planners envisioned the inclusion of Jews living in neutral and non-occupied countries such as Ireland, Sweden, Turkey, and the United Kingdom. Deportations on this scale required the coordination of numerous German government ministries and state organisations, including the Reich Security Main Office (RSHA), the Reich Transport Ministry, and the Reich Foreign Office. The RSHA coordinated and directed the deportations; the Transport Ministry organized train schedules; and the Foreign Office negotiated with German-allied states and their railways about "processing" their own Jews.

The deportation trains did not make major demands on the railways' resources; a typical day during the 1941-2 period would see 30,000 rail services operated by the Reichsbahn - of these, just two would be deportation trains. They were also a low priority, and SS officials such as Franz Novak often faced difficulty in securing the rolling stock needed.

== Journey and point of arrival ==
The first trains with German Jews expelled to ghettos in occupied Poland began departing from central Germany on 16 October 1941. Called Sonderzüge (special trains), the trains had low priority for the movement and frequently had to wait for other trains to pass, inevitably extending transport time beyond expectations.

In Western and Central Europe, trains usually consisted of third class passenger carriages, but in Eastern Europe they usually used freight wagons or cattle wagons; the latter packed with up to 150 deportees, although 50 was the number proposed by the SS regulations. No food or water was supplied. The covered freight wagons were fitted with only a bucket latrine. A small barred window provided irregular ventilation, which oftentimes resulted in multiple deaths from either suffocation or exposure to the elements.

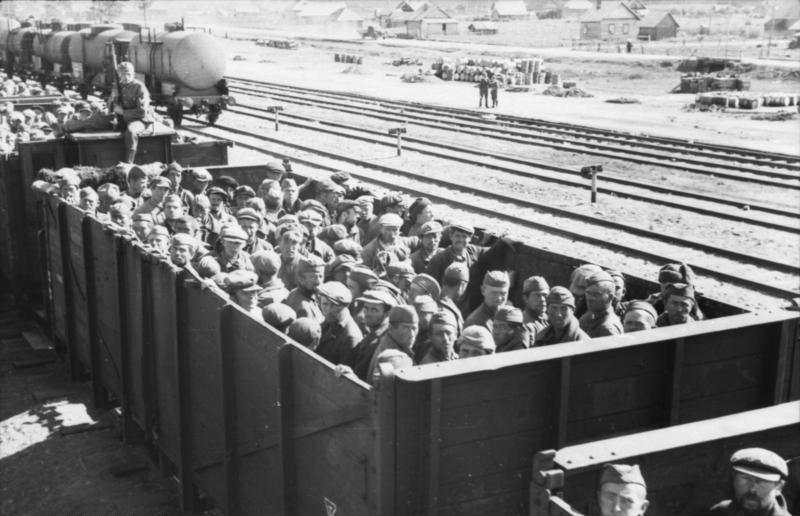
Soviet POWs transported in an open wagon train (September 1941)

Polish forced labourers and Soviet prisoners of war were transported in similar poor conditions, also resulting in many deaths.

At times, the Germans did not have enough Jews to fill an entire train's worth of wagons, so the victims were kept locked inside overnight at layover yards. The Holocaust trains also waited for military trains to pass. An average transport took about four days. The longest transport of the war, from Corfu, took 18 days.

The SS built three extermination camps in occupied Poland specifically for Operation Reinhard: Bełżec, Sobibór, and Treblinka. They were fitted with identical mass-killing installations disguised as communal shower rooms. In addition, gas chambers were developed in 1942 at the Majdanek concentration camp, and at Auschwitz II-Birkenau. In the German-occupied USSR, at the Maly Trostenets extermination camp, shootings were used to kill victims in the woods. At Chełmno, victims were killed in gas vans, whose redirected exhaust fed into sealed compartments at the rear of the vehicle. These were used at Maly Trostenets as well. Neither of these two camps had international rail connections; therefore, the trains stopped at the nearby Łódź Ghetto and Minsk Ghetto, respectively. From there, the prisoners were taken by trucks. At Treblinka, Belzec, and Sobibor, the killing mechanism consisted of a large internal-combustion engine delivering exhaust fumes to gas chambers through pipes. At Auschwitz and Majdanek, the gas chambers relied on Zyklon B pellets of hydrogen cyanide, poured through vents in the roof from cans sealed hermetically.

Once off the transports, the prisoners were split by category. The old, the young, the sick, and the infirm were sometimes separated for immediate death by shooting, while the rest were prepared for the gas chambers. In a single 14-hour workday, 12,000 to 15,000 people would be killed at any one of these camps. The capacity of the crematoria at Birkenau was 20,000 bodies per day.

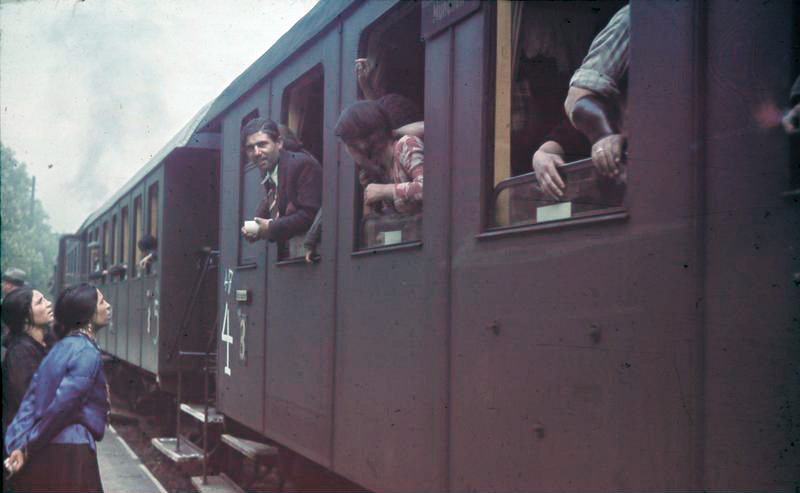
Deportation train from Germany during the Romani Holocaust in 1940. Visible passenger carriages.

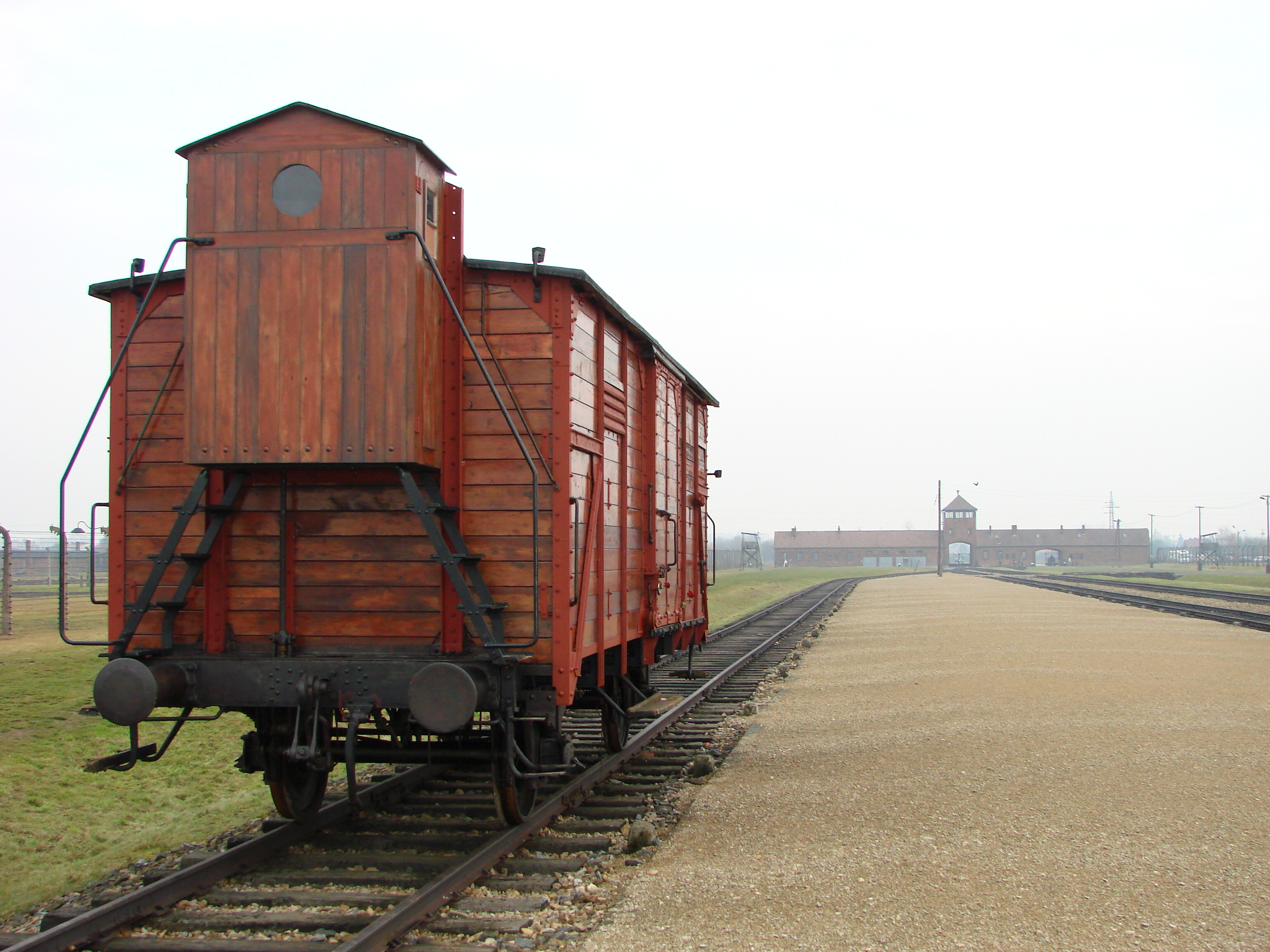
Cattle wagon with brakeman's cabin on siding in Auschwitz.

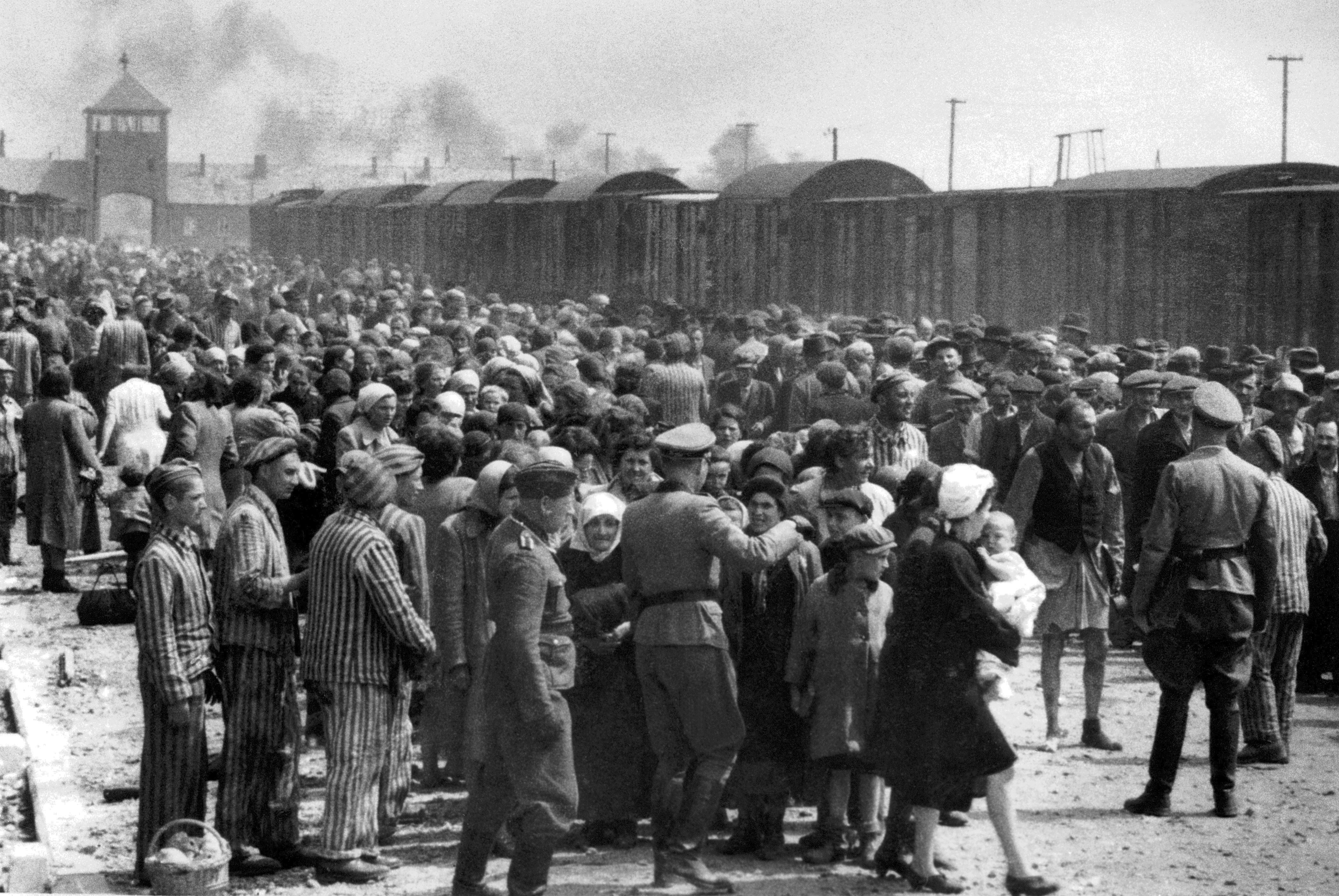
Jews from Carpatho-Ruthenia are "selected" on the Judenrampe in Auschwitz, May–June 1944. To be sent to the right meant assignment to slave labour; to the left, the gas chambers.

== Calculations ==
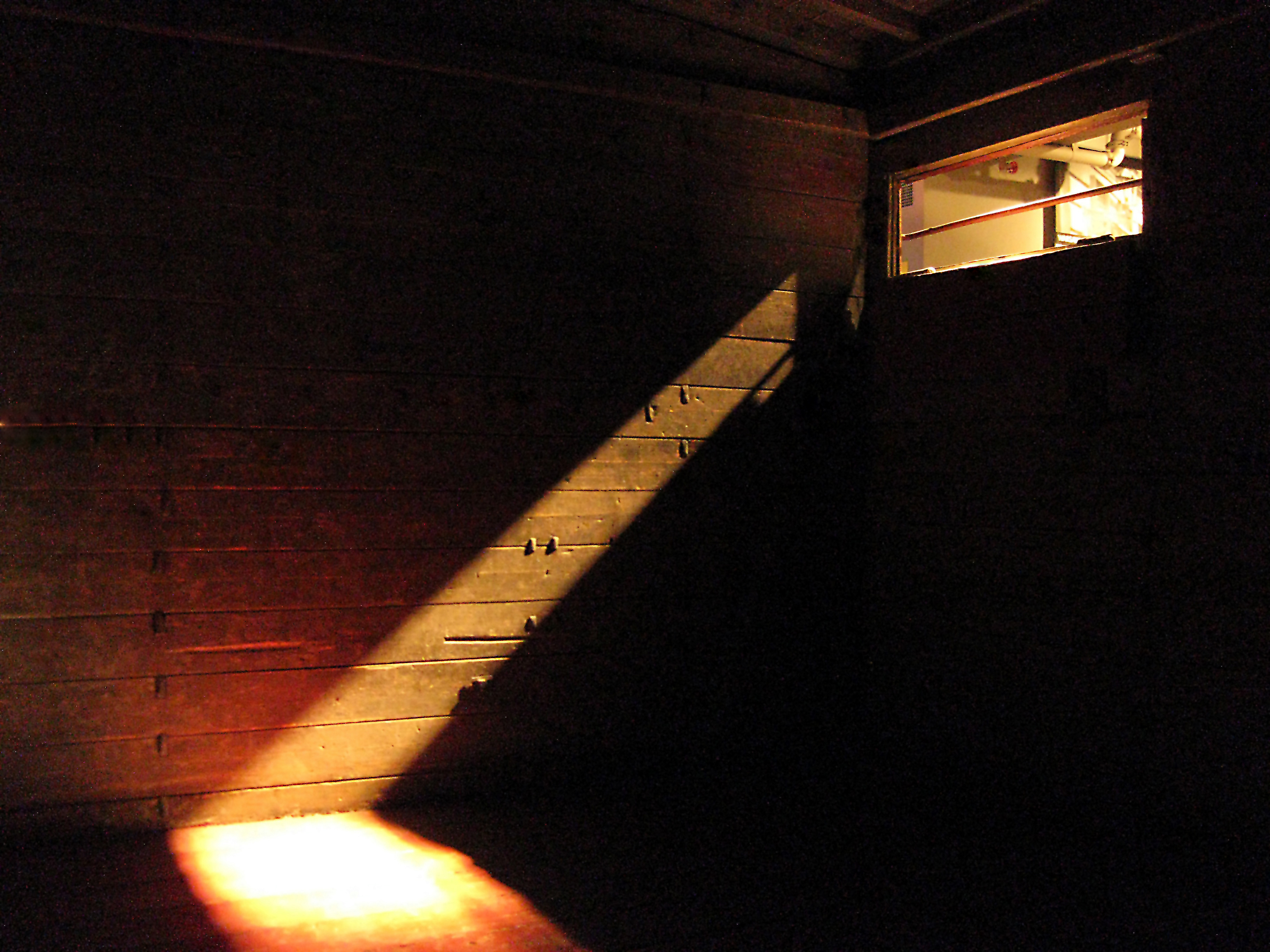
Interior of a covered goods wagon used to transport Jews and other Holocaust victims, the United States Holocaust Memorial Museum in Washington, D.C.

The standard means of transport was a 10-metre long (32 ft 9 3/4 in) freight car, although third class passenger carriages were also used when the SS wanted to keep up the "resettlement to work in the East" myth, particularly in the Netherlands and in Belgium. The SS manual covered such trains, suggesting a carrying capacity per trainset of 2,500 people in 50 cars, each boxcar loaded with 50 prisoners. In reality, however, boxcars were routinely loaded to 200% of capacity or 100 people per car. This resulted in an average of 5,000 people per trainset. During the mass deportation of Jews from the Warsaw Ghetto to Treblinka in 1942, trains carried up to 7,000 victims each.

In total, over 1,600 trains were organised by the Reich Ministry of Transport, and logged mainly by the Polish state railway company taken over by Germany, due to the majority of death camps being located in occupied Poland. Between 1941 and December 1944, the official date of the closing of the Auschwitz-Birkenau complex, the transport/arrival timetable was 1.5 trains per day: 50 freight cars × 50 prisoners per freight car × 1,066 days = ~4,000,000 prisoners in total.

On 20 January 1943, Heinrich Himmler sent a letter to Albert Ganzenmüller, the Under-secretary of State at the Reich Transport Ministry, requesting: "need your help and support. If I am to wind things up quickly, I must have more trains." Of the estimated six million Jews exterminated during World War II, two million were murdered on the spot by the military, Waffen-SS, Order Police battalions and mobile death squads of the Einsatzgruppen aided by and the local auxiliary police. The remainder were shipped to their deaths elsewhere.

== Payment ==
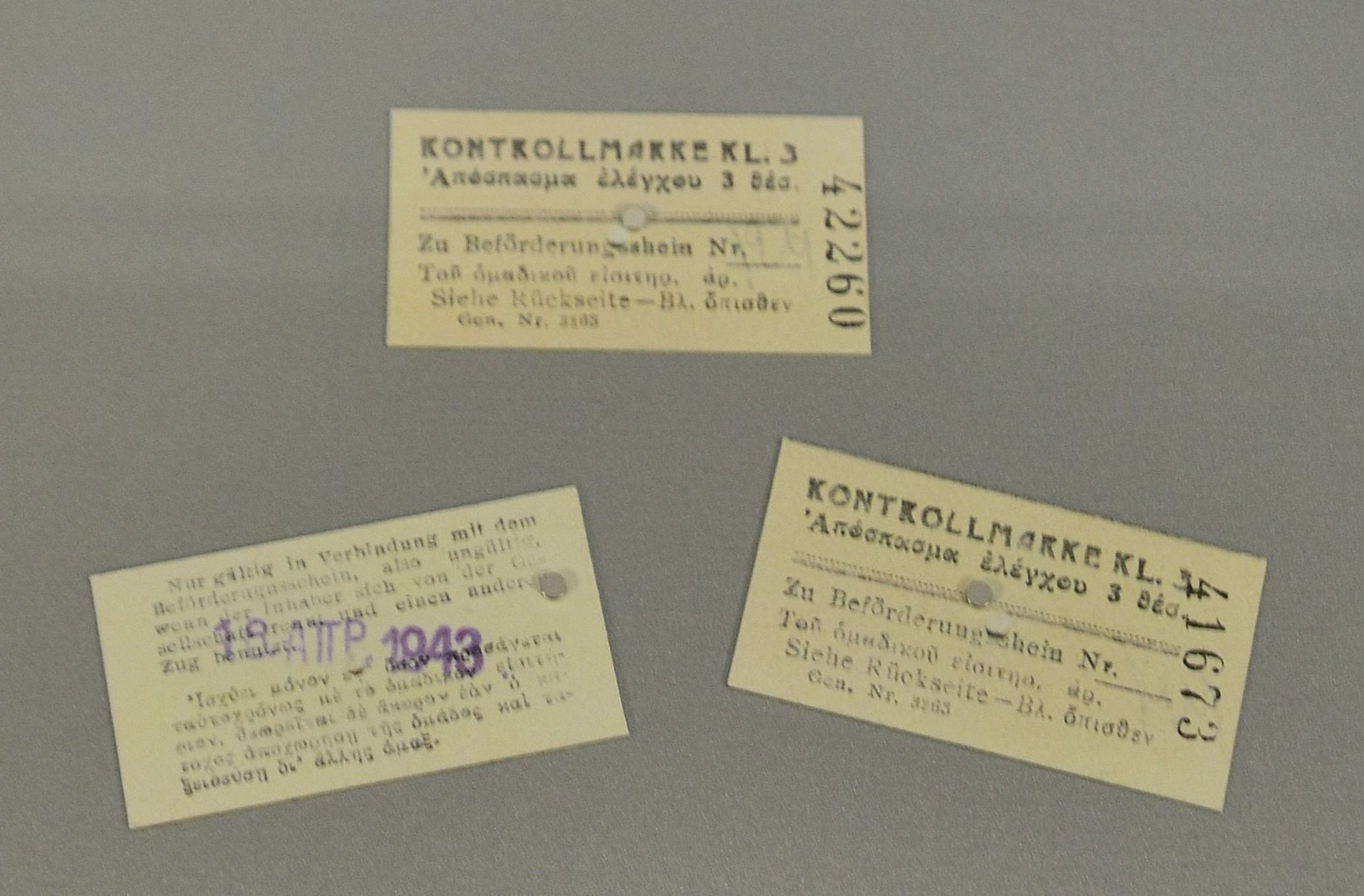
Train tickets of Greek Jews deported to Auschwitz-Birkenau for extermination displayed at the Auschwitz-Birkenau Museum

Most Jews were forced to pay for their own deportations, particularly wherever passenger carriages were used. This payment came in the form of direct money deposit to the SS in light of the "resettlement to work in the East" myth. Charged in the ghettos for accommodation, adult Jews paid full price one-way tickets, while children under 10–12 years of age paid half price, and those under four went free. Jews who had run out of money were the first to be deported.

The SS forwarded part of this money to the German Transport Authority to pay the German Railways for transport of the Jews. The Reichsbahn was paid the equivalent of a third class railway ticket for every prisoner transported to his or her destination: 8,000,000 passengers, 4 Pfennig per track kilometer, times 600 km (average voyage length), equaled 240 million Reichsmarks.

The Reichsbahn pocketed both this money and its own share of the cash paid by the transported Jews after the SS fees. According to an expert report established on behalf of the German "Train of Commemoration" project, the receipts taken in by the state-owned Deutsche Reichsbahn for mass deportations in the period between 1938 and 1945 reached a sum of US$664,525,820.34.

== Operations across Europe ==
Powered mainly by efficient steam locomotives, the Holocaust trains were kept to a maximum of 55 freight cars on average, loaded from 150% to 200% capacity. The participation of German State Railway (the Deutsche Reichsbahn) was crucial to the effective implementation of the "Final Solution of the Jewish Question". The DRB was paid to transport Jews and other victims of the Holocaust from thousands of towns and cities throughout Europe to meet their death in the Nazi concentration camp system.

As well as transporting German Jews, DRB was responsible for coordinating transports on the rail networks of occupied territories and Germany's allies. The characteristics of organized concentration and transportation of victims of the Holocaust varied by country.

=== Belgium ===
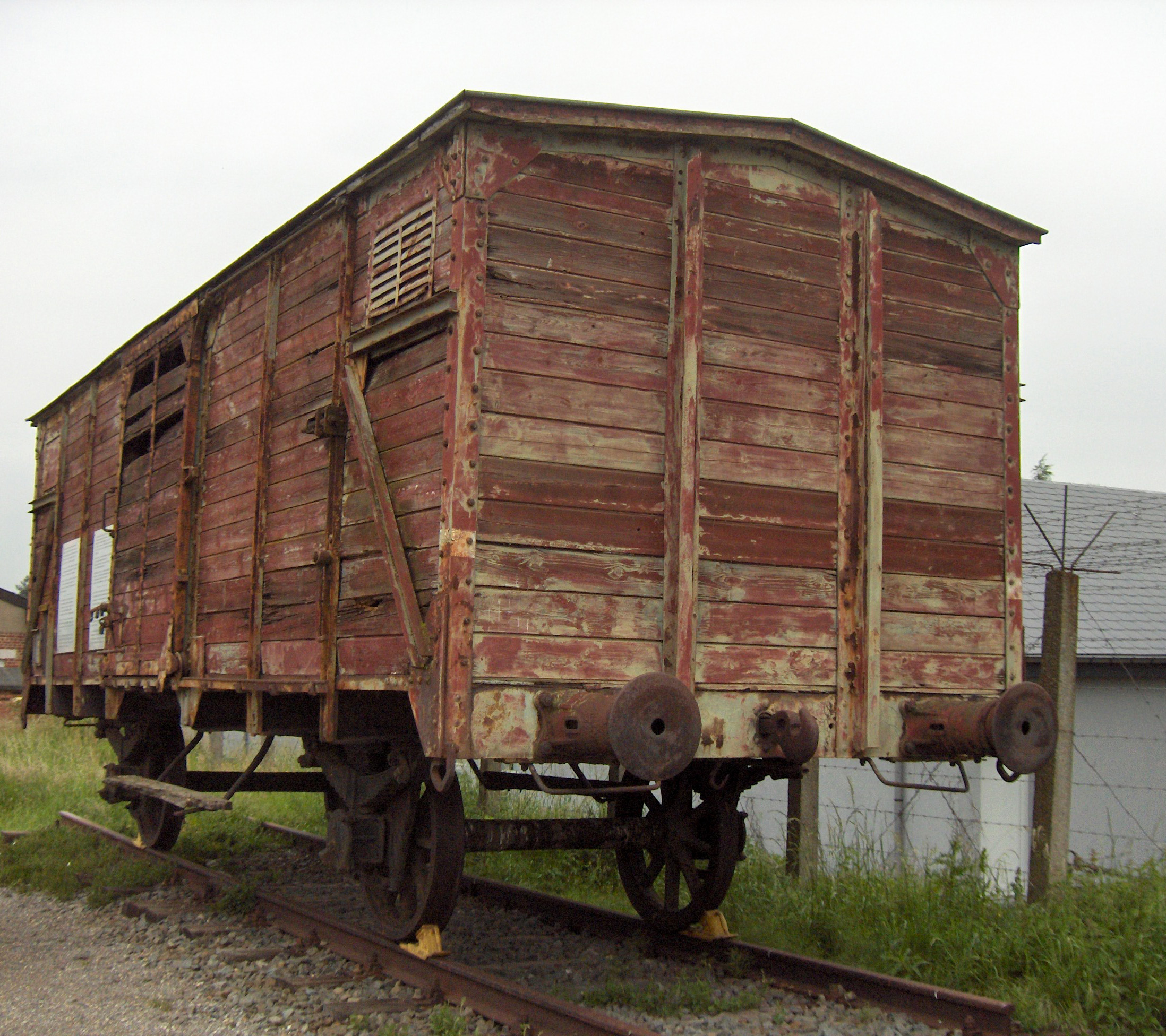
A cattle wagon used for the transport of Belgian Jews to camps in Eastern Europe. The openings were covered in barbed wire. This example is preserved at Fort Breendonk.

After Germany invaded Belgium on 10 May 1940, all Jews were forced to register with the police as of 28 October 1940. The lists enabled Belgium to become the first country in occupied Western Europe to deport recently immigrating Jews. The implementation of the "Final Solution" in Belgium centred on the Mechelen transit camp (Malines) chosen because it was the hub of the Belgian National Railway system. The first convoy left Mechelen for extermination camps on 22 July 1942, although nearly 2,250 Jews had already been deported as forced laborers for Organisation Todt to Northern France. By October 1942, some 16,600 people had been deported in 17 convoys. At this time, deportations were temporarily halted until January 1943. Those deported in the first wave were not Belgian citizens, resulting from the intervention by Queen Elisabeth with the German authorities. In 1943, the deportations of Belgians resumed.

In September, Jews with Belgian citizenship were deported for the first time. After the war, the collaborator Felix Lauterborn stated in his trial that 80 percent of arrests in Antwerp used information from paid informants. In total, 6,000 Jews were deported in 1943, with another 2,700 in 1944. Transports were halted by the deteriorating situation in occupied Belgium before the liberation.

The percentages of Jews who were deported varied by location. It was highest in Antwerp, with 67 percent deported, but lower in Brussels (37 percent), Liége (35 percent) and Charleroi (42 percent). The main destination for the convoys was Auschwitz concentration camp in occupied Poland. Smaller numbers were sent to Buchenwald and Ravensbrück concentration camps, as well as Vittel concentration camp in France. In total, 25,437 Jews were deported from Belgium. Only 1,207 of these survived the war.

The only time during World War II that a Holocaust train carrying Jewish deportees from Western Europe was stopped by the underground happened on 19 April 1943, when the Transport No. 20 left Mechelen with 1,631 Jews, heading for Auschwitz. Soon after leaving Mechelen, the driver stopped the train after seeing an emergency red light, set by the Belgians. After a brief firefight between the Nazi train guards and the three resistance members – equipped only with one pistol between them – the train started again. Of the 233 people who attempted to escape, 26 were shot on the spot, 89 were recaptured, and 118 got away.

=== Bulgaria ===
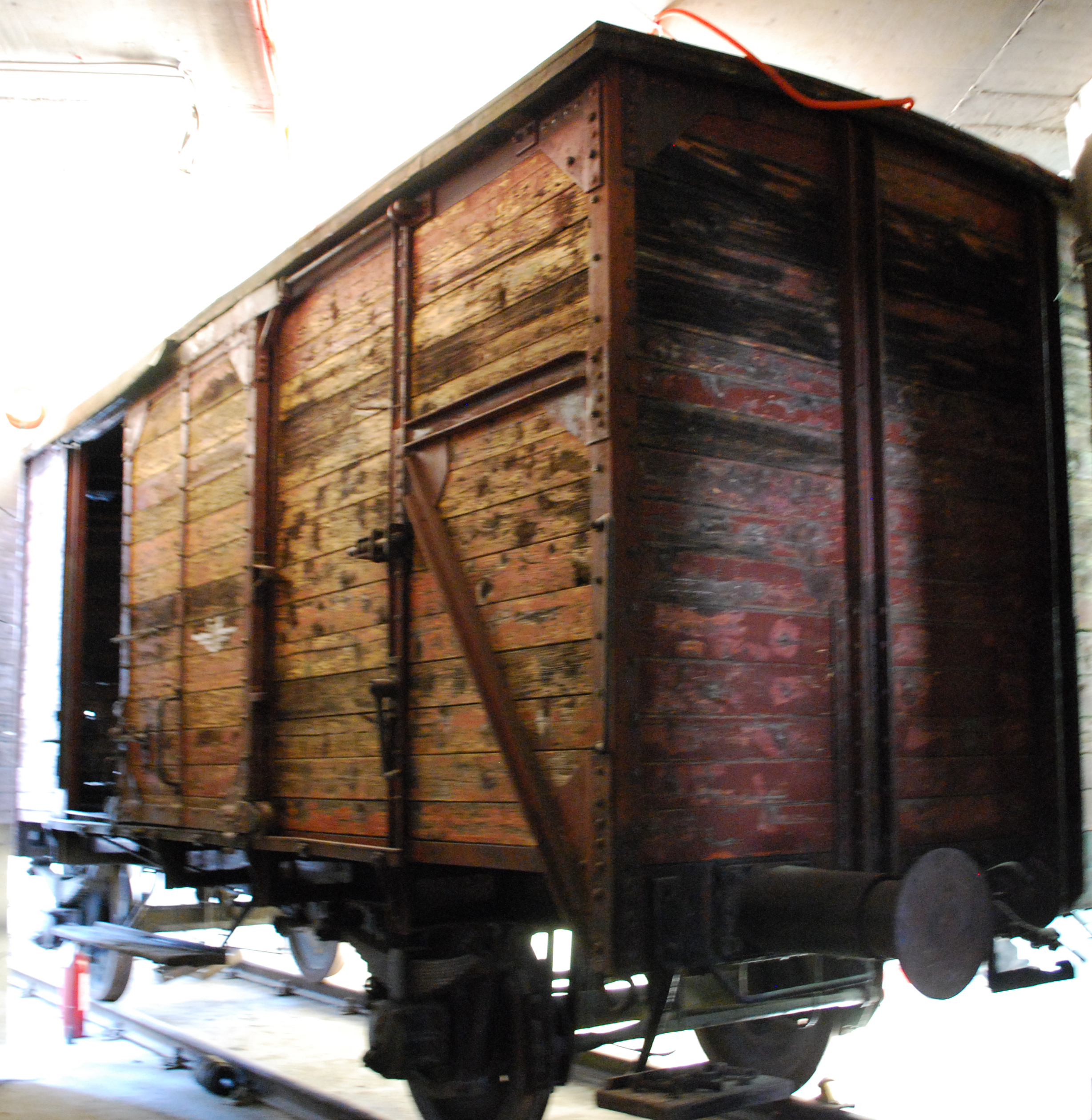
Original wagon used for transport of Macedonian Jews at the Holocaust Memorial Center for the Jews of Macedonia

Bulgaria joined the Axis powers in March 1941 and took part in the invasion of Yugoslavia and Greece. The Bulgarian government set up transit camps in Skopje, Blagoevgrad and Dupnitsa for the Jews from the former Serbian province of Vardar Banovina and Thrace (today's North Macedonia and Greece). The "deportations to the east" of 13,000 inmates, mostly to Treblinka extermination camp began on 22 February 1943, predominantly in passenger cars. In four days, some 20 trainsets departed under severely overcrowded conditions to occupied Poland requiring each train to stop daily to dump the bodies of Jews who died during the previous 24 hours. In May 1943, the Bulgarian government led by King Boris III expelled 20,000 Jews from Sofia and at the same time, made plans to deport Bulgaria's Jews to the camps pursuant to an agreement with Germany. A Holocaust train from Thrace was witnessed by Stefan I, the Metropolitan Bishop of Sofia, who was shocked by what he saw. Ultimately, the Jews of Bulgaria proper were not deported.

=== Bohemia and Moravia ===
Czechoslovakia was annexed by Nazi Germany in 1939. Within the new ethnic-Czech Protectorate of Bohemia and Moravia the Czechoslovak State Railways (ČSD) were taken over by the Reichsbahn and the new German railway company Böhmisch-Mährische Bahn (BMB) was set up in its place. Three-quarters of Bohemian and Moravian Jews were murdered in the Holocaust, of whom 33,000 died in Theresienstadt Ghetto. The remainder were transported in Holocaust trains from Theresienstadt mainly to Auschwitz-Birkenau. The last train for Birkenau left Theresienstadt on 28 October 1944 with 2,038 Jews of whom 1,589 were immediately gassed.

=== France ===
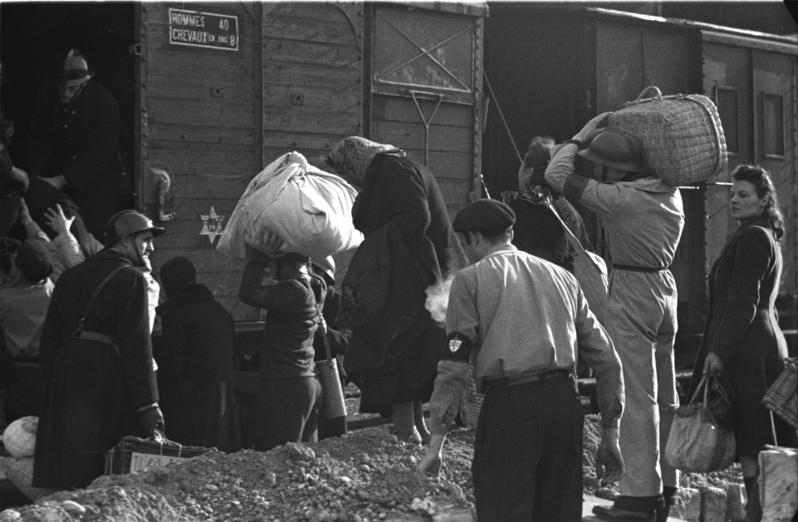
Deportation of Jews during the Marseille roundup, 24 January 1943

The French national SNCF railway company under the Vichy Government was involved in the "Final Solution". In total, the Vichy government deported more than 76,000 Jews, without food or water (pleaded for by the Red Cross in vain), as well as thousands of other so-called undesirables to German-built concentration and extermination camps aboard the Holocaust trains, pursuant to an agreement with the German government; fewer than 3 percent survived the deportations. According to Serge Klarsfeld, president of the organization Sons and Daughters of Jewish Deportees from France, SNCF was forced by German and Vichy authorities to cooperate in providing transport for French Jews to the border and did not make any profit from this transport. However, in December 2014, SNCF agreed to pay up to $60 million worth of compensation to Holocaust survivors in the United States. It corresponds to approximately $100,000 per survivor.

Drancy internment camp served as the main transport hub for the Paris area and regions west and south thereof until August 1944, under the command of Alois Brunner from Austria. By 3 February 1944, 67 trains had left from there for Birkenau. Vittel internment camp served the northeast, closer to the German border from where all transports were taken over by German agents. By 23 June 1943, 50,000 Jews had been deported from France, a pace that the Germans deemed too slow. The last train from France left Drancy on 31 July 1944 with over 300 children.

=== Greece ===
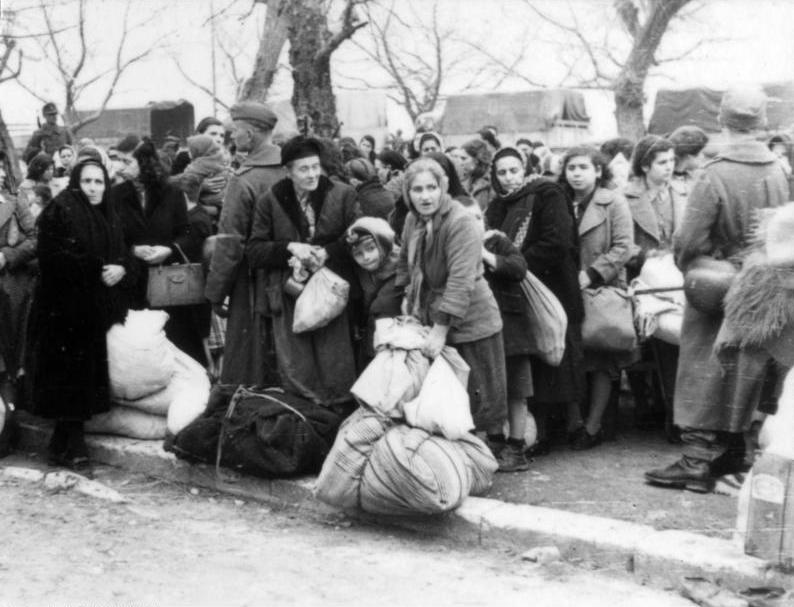
Deportation of Jews from Ioannina in March 1944

After the invasion, Greece was divided between the Italian, Bulgarian, and German zones of occupation until September 1943. Most Greek Jews lived in Thessaloniki (Salonika) ruled by Germany, where the collection camp was set up for the Jews also from Athens and the Greek Islands. From there 45,000–50,000 Jews were sent to Auschwitz-Birkenau between March and August 1943, packed 80 to a wagon. There were also 13,000 Greek Jews in the Italian, and 4,000 Jews in the Bulgarian zone of occupation. In September 1943, the Italian zone was taken over by the Third Reich.

Overall, some 60,000–65,000 Greek Jews were deported in Holocaust trains by the SS to Auschwitz, Majdanek, Dachau and the subcamps of Mauthausen before the war's end, including over 90% of Thessaloniki's prewar population of 50,000 Jews. Of these, 5,000 Jews were deported to Treblinka from the regions of Thrace and from Macedonia in the Bulgarian share of the partitioned Greece, where they were gassed upon arrival.

=== Hungary ===
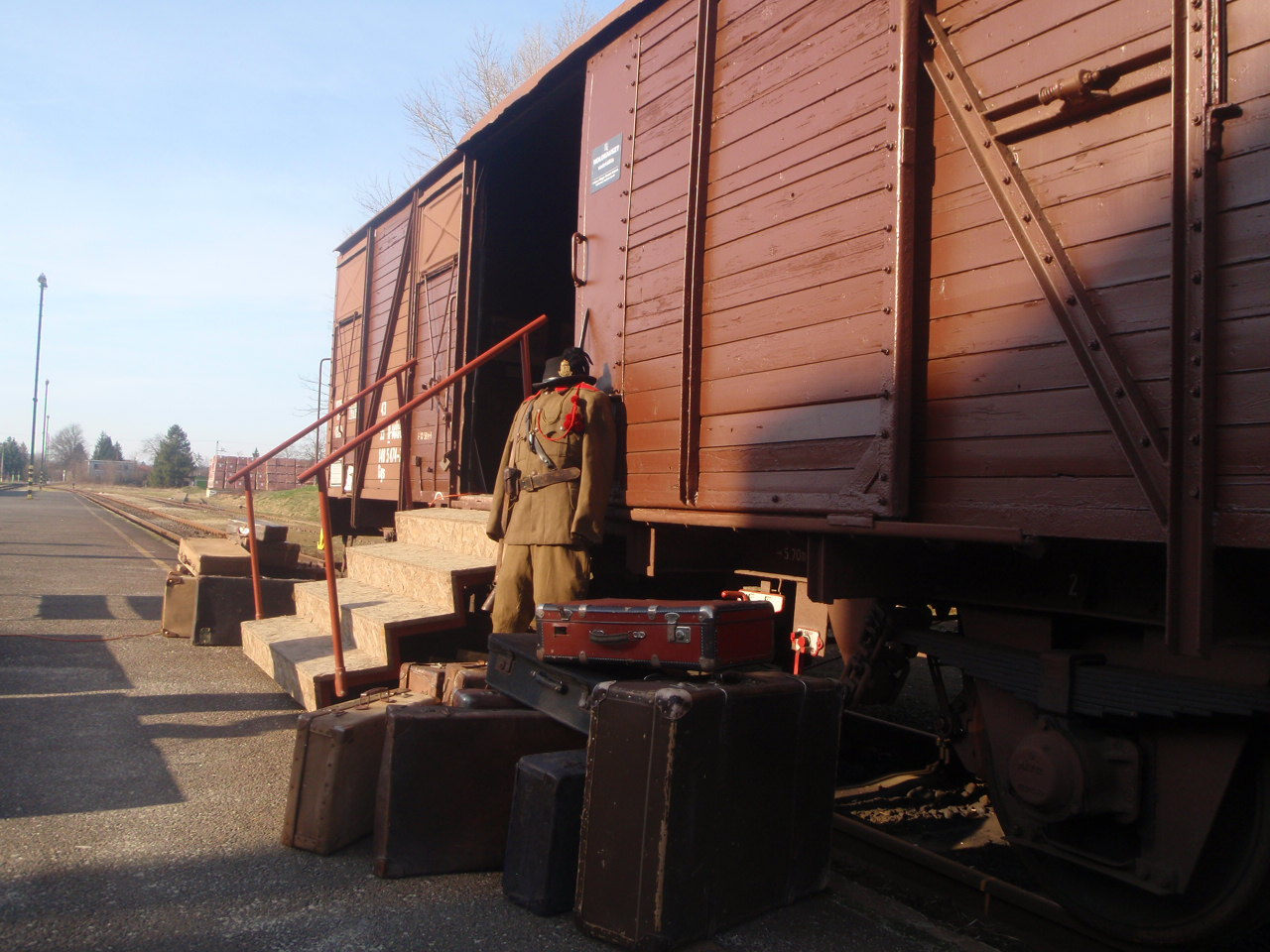
Holocaust train from Hungary, exhibition

Under Hungarian control, the number of Jews officially increased to 725,007 by 1941. Of this total, 184,453 Jews lived in Budapest. While in alliance with Nazi Germany, Hungary acquired new provinces at both the First and the Second Vienna Awards (1938; 1940). The Hungarian Army received vital help from the Hungarian State Railways (MÁV) in Northern Transylvania (Erdély). The non-native Jews were expelled from the Hungarian territory; some 20,000 were transported to occupied Czechoslovakia and Yugoslavia, while the Transylvanian Jews were sent back to Romania. Hungary took part in Operation Barbarossa, supplying 50,000 Jewish slave labour for the Eastern Front. Most of the workers were dead by January 1943. Later that year, Hitler discovered that Prime Minister Miklos Kállay secretly conferred with the Western Allies. To stop him, Germany launched the Operation Margarethe in March 1944, and took over control of all Jewish affairs. On 29 April 1944, the first deportation of Hungarian Jews to Birkenau took place. Between 15 and 25 May according to SS-Brigadeführer Edmund Veesenmayer 138,870 Jews had been deported. On 31 May 1944, Veesenmayer reported an additional 60,000 Jews were sent to the camps in six days, while the total for the past 16 days stood at 204,312 victims. Between May and July 1944, helped by Hungarian police, the German Sicherheitspolizei deported nearly 440,000 Hungarian Jews, mainly to Auschwitz-Birkenau, or 437,000 at the rate of 6,250 per day.

Approximately 320,000 Hungarian Jews are estimated to have been murdered at Auschwitz-Birkenau before July 1944. On 8 July, the deportation of Jews from Hungary had stopped due to international pressure by the Pope, the King of Sweden, and the Red Cross (all of whom had recently learned about the extent of it). However, in October 1944 some 50,000 Jews were forced on a death march to Germany following a coup d'état which put the Hungarian pro-Nazi government back in control. They were forced to dig anti-tank ditches on the road westward. A further 25,000 Jews were put in an "international ghetto" under Swedish protection engineered by Carl Lutz and Raoul Wallenberg. When the Soviet Army liberated Budapest on 17 January 1945, of the original 825,000 Jews in the country, less than 260,000 Jews were still alive, including 80,000 Hungarian natives.

=== Italy ===
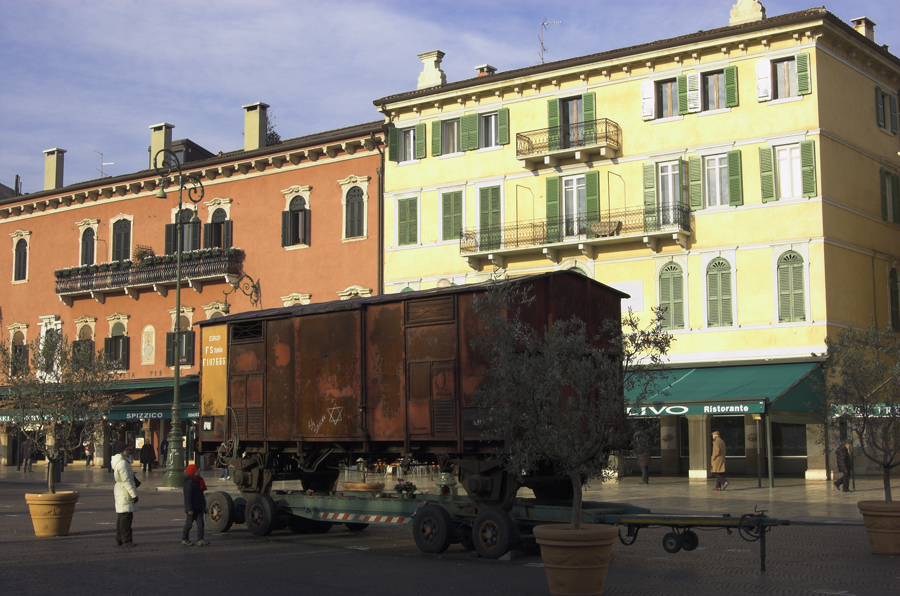
Italian Holocaust train exhibition, Verona

The popular view that Benito Mussolini resisted the deportation of Italian Jews to Germany is widely seen as simplistic by Jewish scholars, because the Italian Jewish community of 47,000 constituted the most assimilated Jews in Europe. About one out of every three Jewish males were members of the Fascist Party before the war began; more than 10,000 Jews who used to conceal their identity, because antisemitism was part of the very ideal of italianità, wrote Wiley Feinstein.

The Holocaust came to Italy in September 1943 after the German takeover of the country due to its total capitulation at Cassibile. By February 1944, the Germans shipped 8,000 Jews to Auschwitz-Birkenau via Austria and Switzerland, although more than half of the victims arrested and deported from northern Italy were rounded up by the Italian police and not by the Nazis. Also between September 1943 and April 1944, at least 23,000 Italian soldiers were deported to work as slaves in the German war industry, while over 10,000 partisans were captured and deported during the same period to Birkenau. By 1944, there were over half a million Italians working for the benefit of the German war machine.

=== Netherlands ===
The Netherlands was invaded on 10 May 1940 and fell under German military control. The community of native-Dutch Jews including the new Jewish refugees from Germany and Austria was estimated at 140,000. Most natives were concentrated in the Amsterdam ghetto before being moved to Westerbork transit camp in the north-east near the German border. Deportees for "resettlement" leaving aboard the NS passenger and freight trains were unaware of their final destination or fate, as postcards were often thrown from moving trains.

Most of the approximately 100,000 Jews sent to Westerbork perished. Between July 1942 and September 1944 almost every Tuesday a train left for Auschwitz-Birkenau and Sobibor extermination camps, or Bergen-Belsen and Theresienstadt, in 94 outgoing trains. About 60,000 prisoners were sent to Auschwitz and 34,000 to Sobibor. At liberation approximately 870 Jews remained in Westerbork. Only 5,200 deportees survived, most of them in Theresienstadt, approximately 1980 survivors, or Bergen-Belsen, approximately 2050 survivors. From those on the sixty-eight transports to Auschwitz 1052 people returned, including 181 of the 3450 people taken from eighteen of the trains at Cosel. There were 18 survivors out of approximately one thousand people selected from the nineteen trains to Sobibor, the remainder being murdered on arrival. For the Netherlands, the overall survival rate among Jews who boarded the trains for all camps was 4.86 percent. On 29 September 2005, the Dutch national rail company Nederlandse Spoorwegen (NS) apologised for its role in the deportation of Jews to the death camps.

=== Norway ===
Norway surrendered to Nazi Germany on 10 June 1940. At the time, there were 1,700 Jews living in Norway. About half of them escaped to neutral Sweden. Round-ups by the SS began in the fall of 1942 with the support of the Norwegian police. In late November 1942, all Jews of Oslo including women and children were put on a ship requisitioned by the Quisling government and taken to Hamburg, Germany. From there, they were deported to Auschwitz-Birkenau by train. In total, 770 Norwegian Jews were sent by boat to Germany between 1940 and 1945. Only two dozen survived.

=== Poland ===
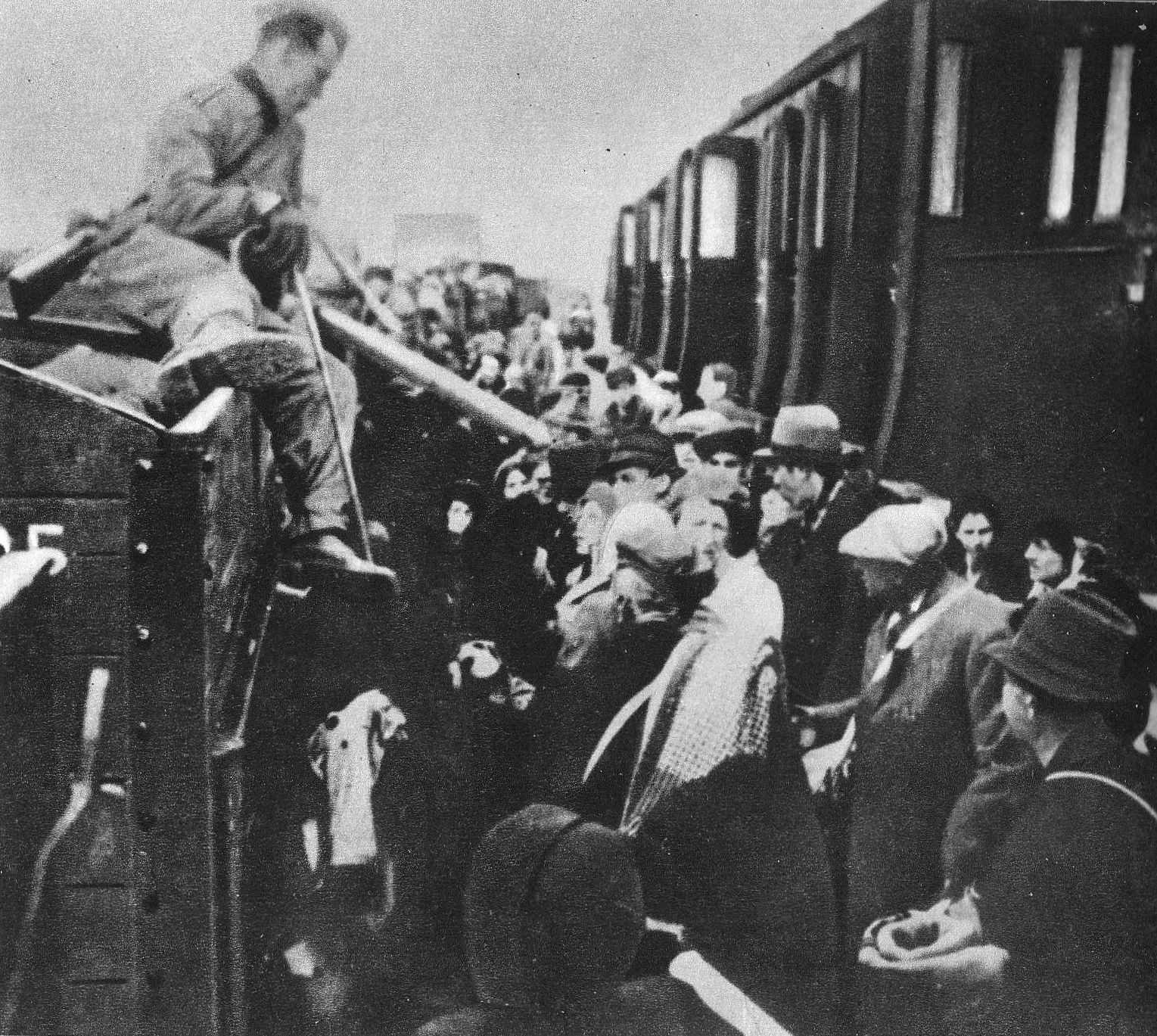
Jews are transferred to a narrow-gauge railway on the way to Kulmhof extermination camp.

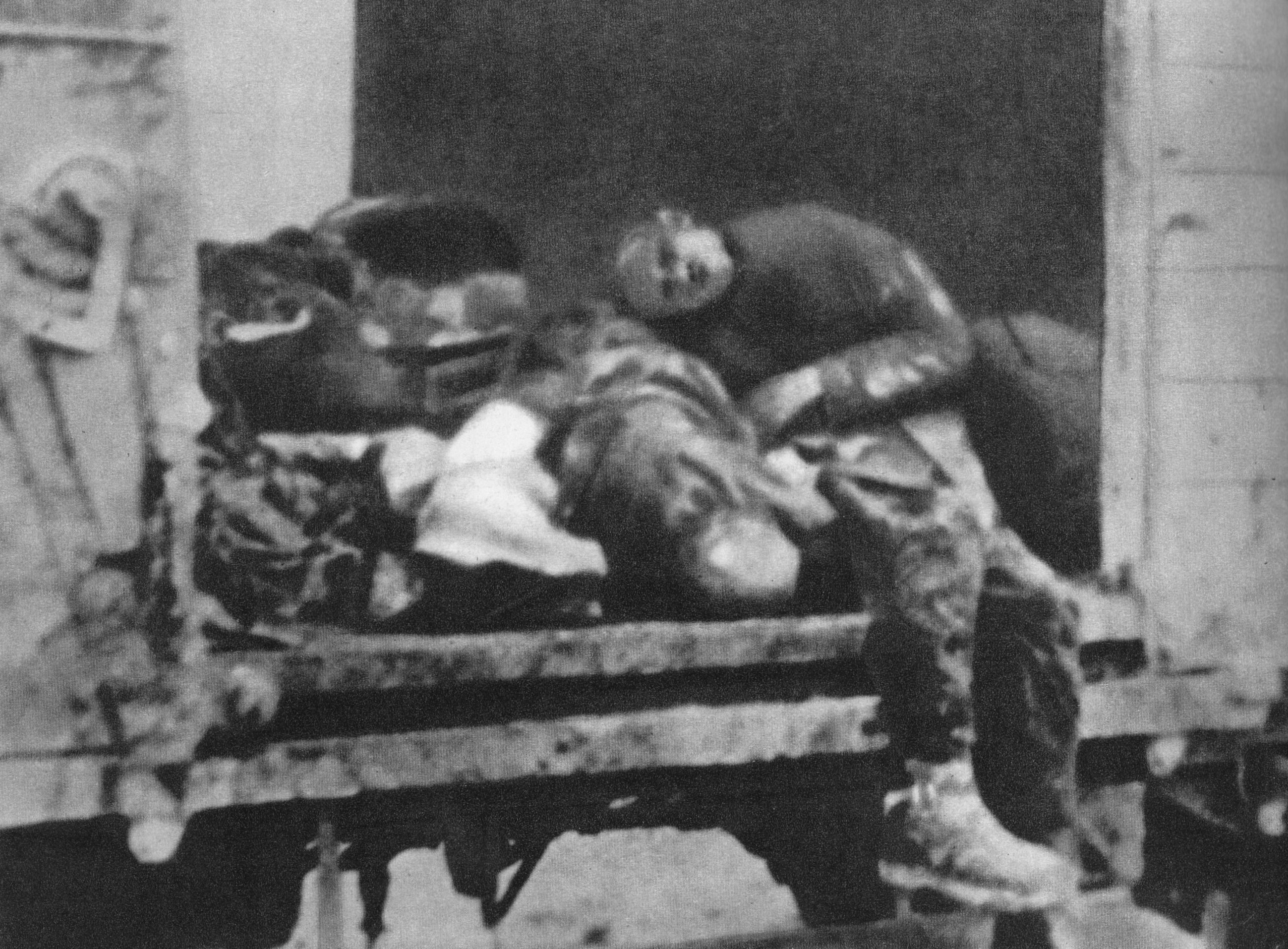
Corpses of Jews from the Warsaw Ghetto who died inside sealed boxcars before reaching Treblinka extermination camp, August 1942

Following the invasion of Poland in September 1939, Nazi Germany disbanded the Polish National Railways (PKP) immediately, and handed over their assets to the Deutsche Reichsbahn in Silesia, Greater Poland and in Pomerania. In November 1939, as soon as the semi-colonial General Government was set up in occupied central Poland, a separate branch of DRB called Generaldirektion der Ostbahn (Kolej Wschodnia in Polish) was established with headquarters called GEDOB in Kraków; all of the DRB branches existed outside Germany proper. The Ostbahn was granted 3,818 kilometres (2,372 mi) of railway lines (nearly doubled by 1941) and 505 km of narrow gauge, initially.

In December 1939, on the request of Hans Frank in Berlin, the Ostbahndirektion was given financial independence after paying back 10 million Reichsmarks to DRB. The removal of all bomb damage was completed in 1940. The Polish management was either executed in mass shooting actions (see: the 1939 Intelligenzaktion and the 1940 German AB-Aktion in Poland) or imprisoned at the Nazi concentration camps. Managerial jobs were staffed with German officials in a wave of some 8,000 instant promotions. The new Eastern Division of DRB acquired 7,192 kilometres (4,469 mi) of new railway lines and 1,052 km of (mostly industrial) narrow gauge in the annexed areas.

The Deutsche Reichsbahn acquired new infrastructure in Poland worth in excess of 8,278,600,000 złoty, including some of the largest locomotive factories in Europe, the H. Cegielski – Poznań renamed DWM, and Fablok in Chrzanów renamed Oberschlesische Lokomotivwerke Krenau producing engines Ty37 and Pt31 (designed in Poland), as well as the locomotive parts factory Babcock-Zieleniewski in Sosnowiec renamed Ferrum AG (tasked with making parts to V-1 i V-2 rockets also). Under the new management, formerly Polish companies began producing German engines BR44, BR50 and BR86 as early as 1940 virtually for free, using forced labor. All Polish railwaymen were ordered to return to their place of work, or face death. Beating with fists became commonplace, although perceived as shocking by Polish long-term professionals. Their public executions were introduced in 1942. By 1944, the factories in Poznań and Chrzanów were mass-producing for the Eastern Front the redesigned "Kriegslok" BR52 locomotives stripped of non-ferrous metals and instead made mostly of steel; locomotives in that battlespace were not expected to survive for long, so managers eliminated the use of higher-value metal like bronze, chrome, copper, brass, and nickel.

Before the onset of Operation Reinhard which marked the most deadly phase of the Holocaust in Poland many Jews were transported by road to killing sites such as the Chełmno extermination camp, equipped with gas vans. In 1942, stationary gas chambers were built at Treblinka, Belzec, Sobibor, Majdanek and Auschwitz. After the Nazi takeover of PKP, the train movements, originating inside and outside occupied Poland and terminating at death camps, were tracked by Dehomag using IBM-supplied card-reading machines and traditional waybills produced by the Reichsbahn. The Holocaust trains were always managed and directed by native German SS men posted with that express' role throughout the system.

The transports to camps under Operation Reinhard came mainly from the ghettos. The Warsaw Ghetto in the General Government held eventually over 450,000 Jews cramped in an area meant for about 60,000 people. The second-largest Ghetto in Łódź held 204,000 Jews. Both ghettos had collection points known as Umschlagplatz along the rail tracks, with most deportations from Warsaw to Treblinka taking place between 22 July and 12 September 1942. The gassing at Treblinka started on 23 July 1942, with two pendulum trains delivering victims six days each week ranging from about 4,000 to 7,000 victims per transport, the first in the early morning and the second in the mid-afternoon. All new arrivals were sent immediately to the undressing area by the Sonderkommando squad that managed the arrival platform, and from there to the gas chambers. According to German records, including the official report by SS Brigadeführer Jürgen Stroop, some 265,000 Jews were transported in freight trains from the Warsaw Ghetto to Treblinka during this period. The murder operation code-named Grossaktion Warsaw concluded several months before the subsequent Warsaw Ghetto Uprising resulting in new deportations. The 1942 Höfle Telegram of the total number of victims most of whom were transported by train to Operation Reinhard death camps, including cumulative numbers known today, is as follows:

Location	Numbers and notes
Belzec	quoted: 434,508 (real total of 600,000 with 246,922 deportees from within the semi-colonial General Government alone, per contemporary research)
Majdanek	quoted: 24,733 (cumulative number of 130,000 victims, per Majdanek State Museum research)
Sobibor	quoted: 101,370 (final count in excess of 200,000 with 140,000 from Lublin, and 25,000 Jews from Lviv alone per contemporary historians)
Treblinka	quoted: 713,555 (overall minimum of 800,000–900,000 at Camp II and 20,000 at Camp I)

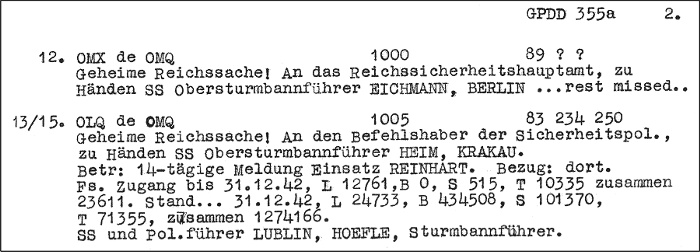
The Höfle Telegram lists the number of arrivals to the Aktion Reinhard Camps through 1942 (1,274,166)

The Höfle Telegram lists the number of arrivals to the Reinhard camps through 1942 as 1,274,166 Jews based on Reichsbahn own records. The last train to be sent to Treblinka extermination camp left Białystok Ghetto on 18 August 1943; all prisoners were murdered in gas chambers after which the camp closed down per Globocnik's directive. Of the more than 245,000 Jews who passed through the Łódź Ghetto, the last 68,000 inmates, by then the largest final gathering of Jews in all of German-occupied Europe, had been murdered by the Nazis after 7 August 1944. They were told to prepare for resettlement; instead, over the next 23 days they were sent to Auschwitz-Birkenau by train at the rate of 2,500 per day.

=== Romania ===
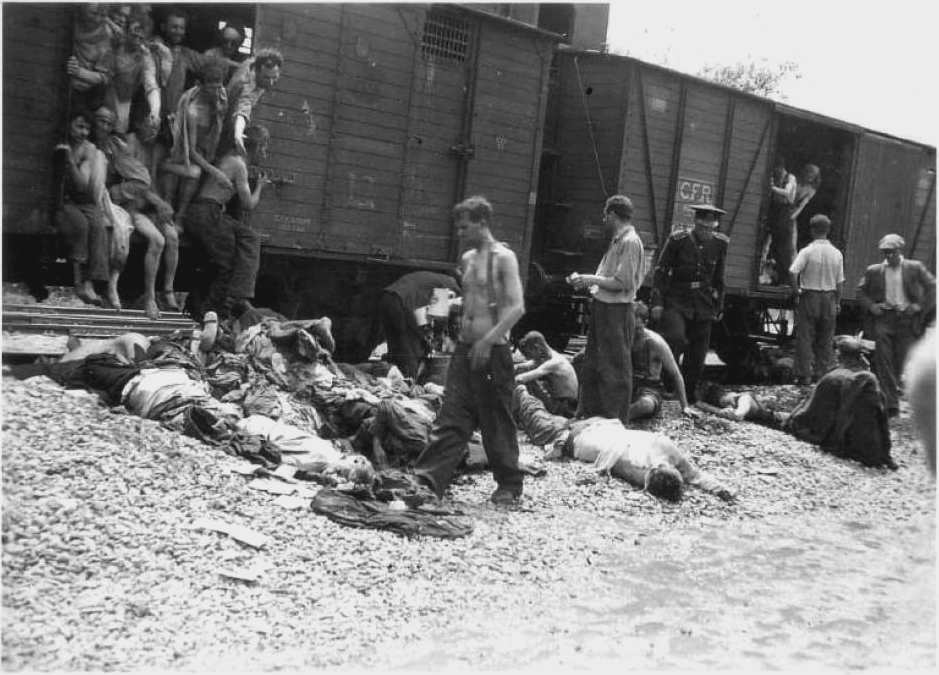
Pulling dead Jews from the "death train" of Iași pogrom, July 1941

Căile Ferate Române (Romanian Railways) were involved in the transport of Jewish and Romani people to concentration camps in Romanian Old Kingdom, Bessarabia, northern Bukovina, and Transnistria. In a notable example, after the Iasi pogrom events, Jews were forcibly loaded onto freight cars with planks hammered in place over the windows and traveled for seven days in unimaginable conditions. Many died and were gravely affected by lack of air, blistering heat, lack of water, food or medical attention. These veritable death trains arrived to their destinations Podu Iloaiei and Călăraşi with only one-fifth of their passengers alive. No official apology was released yet by Căile Ferate Române for their role in the Holocaust in Romania.

=== Slovakia ===
On 9 September 1941, the parliament of the Slovak State ratified the Jewish Codex, a series of laws and regulations that stripped Slovakia's 89,000 Jews of their civil rights and means of economic survival. The ruling Slovak People's Party paid 500 Reichsmarks per expelled Jew, in exchange for a promise that the deportees would never return to Slovakia. Except for Croatia, Slovakia was the only Axis ally to pay for the deportation of its own Jewish population. Most of the Jewish population perished in two waves of deportations. The first, in 1942, took away two-thirds of the Slovak Jews; the second wave after the Slovak National Uprising in 1944 claimed another 13,500 victims, 10,000 of whom did not return.

=== Switzerland ===
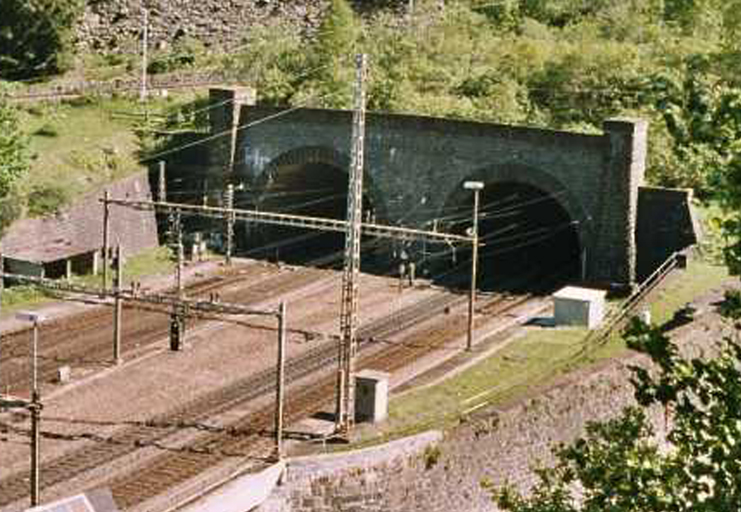
Entrance to the Gotthard Tunnel

Switzerland was not invaded because its mountain bridges and tunnels between Germany and Italy were too vital for them to go into war, while the Swiss banks provided necessary access to international markets by dealing in pilfered gold. Most war supplies to Italy were shipped through the Austrian Brenner Pass.

There exists substantial evidence that these shipments included Italian forced labour workers and trainloads of Jews in 1944 during the German occupation of northern Italy, when a German train passed through Switzerland every 10 minutes. The need for the tunnel was complicated by the British Royal Air Force having bombed and disrupted services through the Brenner Pass, as well as a heavy snowfall in the winter of 1944–45. Of 43 trains that could be tracked down by the 1996 Bergier Commission, 39 went via Austria (Brenner, Tarvisio), one via France (Ventimiglia-Nice). The commission could not find any evidence that the other three passed through Switzerland. It is possible that the train could have been carrying dissidents back from concentration camps. Started in 1944, some repatriation trains went through Switzerland officially, organised by the Red Cross.

== Aftermath ==
After the Soviet Army began to advance into German-occupied Europe and the Allies landed in Normandy in June 1944, the number of trains and transported persons began to vary greatly. By November 1944, with the closure of Birkenau, the death trains had ceased. As the Soviet and Allied armies made their final pushes, the Nazis transported some of the concentration camp survivors either to other camps located inside the collapsing Third Reich, or to the border areas where they believed they could negotiate the release of captured German prisoners of war in return for the "Exchange Jews" or those that were born outside the German-occupied territories. Many of the inmates were transported via the infamous death marches, but among other transports, three trains left Bergen-Belsen in April 1945 bound for Theresienstadt—all were liberated.

The last recorded train is the one used to transport the women of the Flossenbürg March, where for three days in March 1945 the remaining survivors were crammed into cattle cars to await further transport. Only 200 of the original 1000 women survived the entire trip to Bergen-Belsen.

== Remembrance and commemoration ==
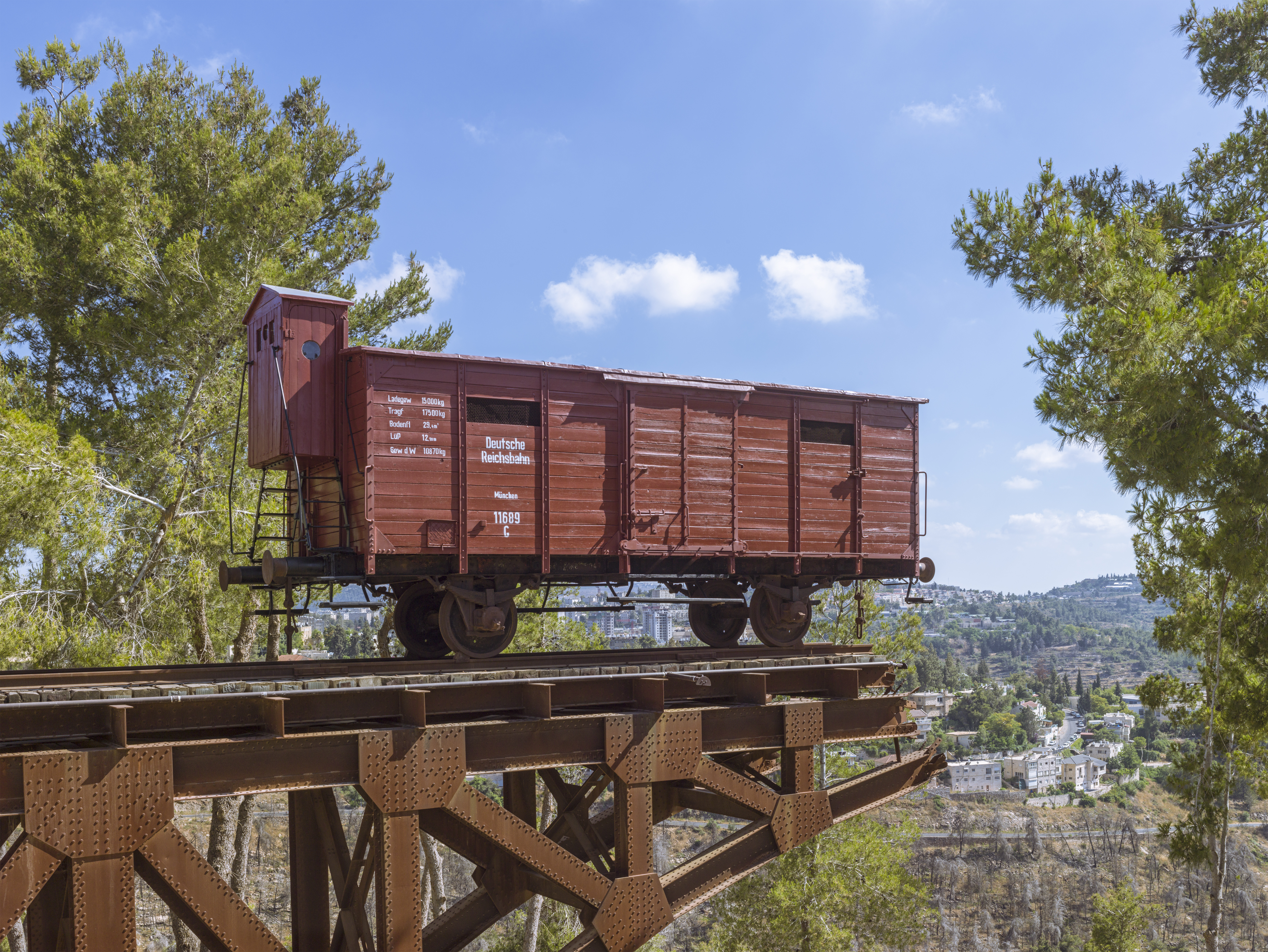
The wagon monument, Yad Vashem, Jerusalem

There are numerous national commemorations of the mass transportation of Jews in the "Final Solution" across Europe, as well as some lingering controversies surrounding the history of the railway systems utilized by the Nazis.

=== France ===
In 1992, SNCF commissioned a report on its involvement in World War II. The company opened its archives to an independent historian, Christian Bachelier, whose report was released in French in 2000. It was translated to English in 2010.

In 2001, a lawsuit was filed against French government-owned rail company SNCF by Georges Lipietz, a Holocaust survivor, who was transported by SNCF to the Drancy internment camp in 1944. Lipietz was held at the internment camp for several months before the camp was liberated. After Lipietz's death the lawsuit was pursued by his family and in 2006 an administrative court in Toulouse ruled in favor of the Lipietz family. SNCF was ordered to pay 61,000 Euros in restitution. SNCF appealed the ruling at an administrative appeals court in Bordeaux, where in March 2007 the original ruling was overturned. According to historian Michael Marrus, the court in Bordeaux "declared the railway company had acted under the authority of the Vichy government and the German occupation" and as such could not be held independently liable. (Note: Following the Lipietz trial, SNCF's involvement in World War II became the subject of attention in the United States when SNCF explored bids on rail projects in Florida and California, and SNCF's partly owned subsidiary, Keolis Rail Services America bid on projects in Virginia and Maryland. In 2010, Keolis placed a bid on a contract to operate the Brunswick and Camden lines of the MARC train in Maryland. Following pressure from Holocaust survivors in Maryland, the state passed legislation in 2011 requiring companies bidding on the project to disclose their involvement in the Holocaust. Keolis currently operates the Virginia Railway Express, a contract the company received in 2010. In California, also in 2010, state lawmakers passed the Holocaust Survivor Responsibility Act. The bill, written to require companies to disclose their involvement in World War II, was later vetoed by Governor Arnold Schwarzenegger. While bidding on these rail contracts, SNCF was criticized for not formally acknowledging and apologizing for its involvement in World War II. In 2011, SNCF chairman Guillaume Pepy released a formal statement of regrets for the company's actions during World War II. Some historians have expressed the opinion that SNCF has been unfairly targeted in the United States for their involvement in World War II. Human rights attorney Arno Klarsfeld has argued that the negative focus on SNCF was disrespectful to the French railway workers who lost their lives engaging in acts of resistance.) Marrus wrote in his 2011 essay that the company has nevertheless taken responsibility for its actions and it is the company's willingness to open up its archives revealing involvement in the transportation of Holocaust victims that has led to the recent legal and legislative attention.

Between 2002 and 2004 the SNCF helped fund an exhibit on the deportation of Jewish children that was organized by Nazi hunter Serge Klarsfeld. In 2011, SNCF helped set up a railway station outside of Paris to a Shoah Foundation for the creation of a memorial to honor Holocaust victims. In December 2014, the company came to a $60 million compensation settlement with French Holocaust survivors living in the United States.

=== Germany ===
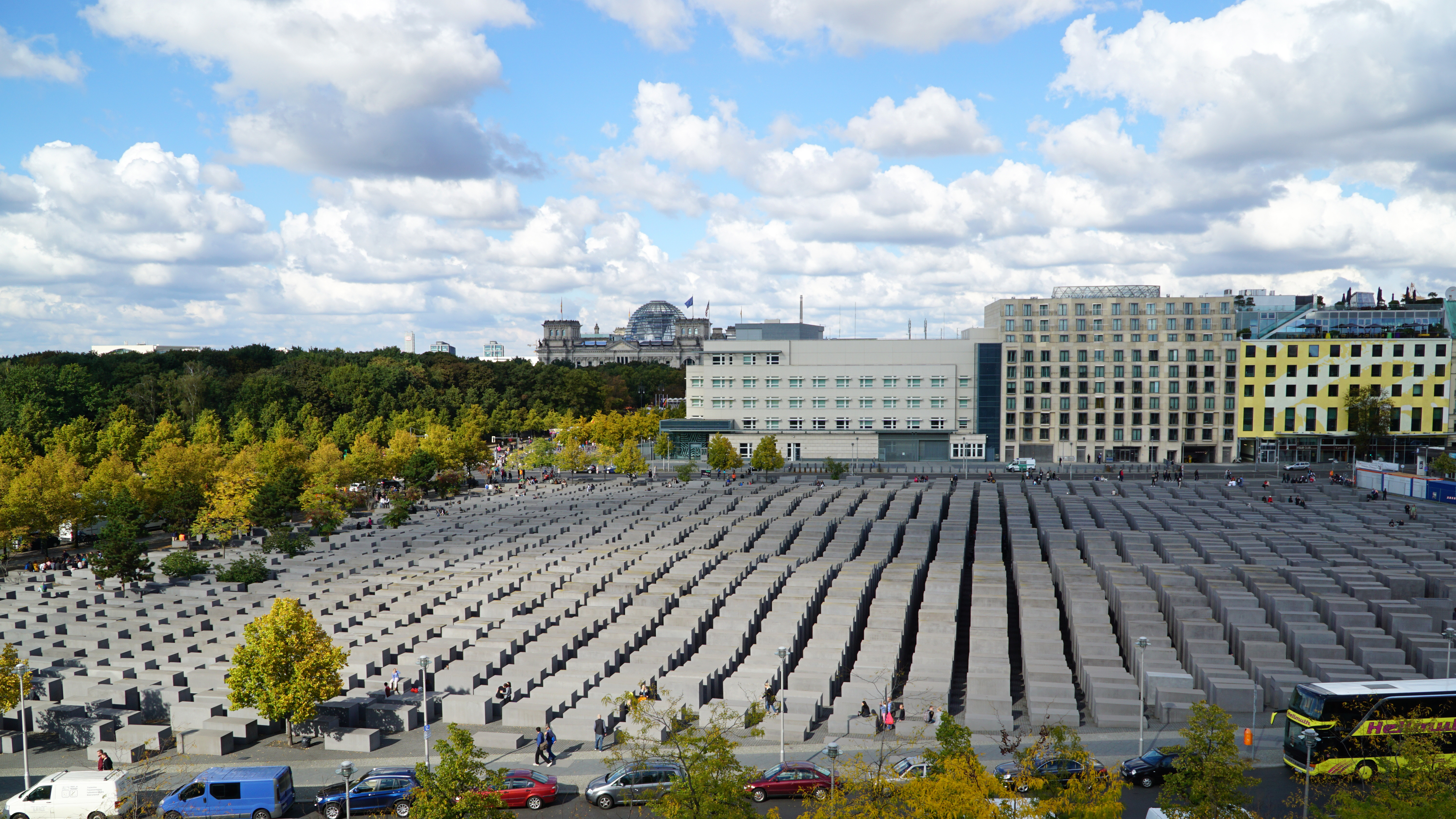
Memorial to the Murdered Jews of Europe, view from the south

In 2004/2005, German historians and journalists began publicly demanding that the German passenger train stations' commemorative exhibits be set up after the railroad companies in France and the Netherlands began commemorations of mass deportations in their own train stations. The Deutsche Bahn AG (DB AG), the state-owned successor of the Deutsche Reichsbahn replied: "we do not have either the personnel or the financial resources" for that kind of commemoration. Demonstrations then began at railway stations in Frankfurt am Main and in Cologne as well as inside the long-distance border-crossing trains. Because the DB AG had responded by having its security personnel repress the protests, German citizens' initiatives rented a historical steam locomotive and installed their own exhibition in remodeled passenger cars. This "Train of Commemoration" made its first journey on the 2007 International Holocaust Remembrance Day of January 27. The Deutsche Bahn AG refused it access to the main stations in Hamburg and Berlin. German Jewish communities protested against the company levying mileage tariffs and hourly fees for the exhibit (which by December 31, 2013, reached approx. US $290,000).

Parliamentarians of all parties in the German national parliament called on the DB AG to rethink its behavior. Federal Transport Minister Wolfgang Tiefensee proposed an exhibition by artist Jan Philipp Reemtsma on the railways' role in the deportation of 11,000 Jewish children to their deaths in Nazi concentration and extermination camps throughout World War II. Because the CEO of the railroad company maintained his refusal, a "serious rift" occurred between himself and the Minister of Transport. On January 23, 2008, a compromise was reached, wherein the DB AG established its own stationary exhibit Sonderzüge in den Tod [Chartered Trains to Death – Deportation with the German Reichsbahn]. As national press journals pointed out, the exhibit "contained nearly nothing about the culprits". The post-war careers of those in charge of the railroad remained "totally obscured". Since 2009, the civil society association Train of Commemoration which, with its donations financed the exhibition "Train of Commemoration" presented at 130 German stations with 445,000 visitors, has been demanding cumulative compensation for the survivors of these deportations by train. The railroad's proprietors (the German Minister of Transport and the German Minister of Finances) rejected this demand.

=== Netherlands ===
Nederlandse Spoorwegen used its 29 September 2005 apology for its role in the "Final Solution" to launch an equal opportunities and anti-discrimination policy, in part to be monitored by the Dutch Jewish council.

=== Poland ===
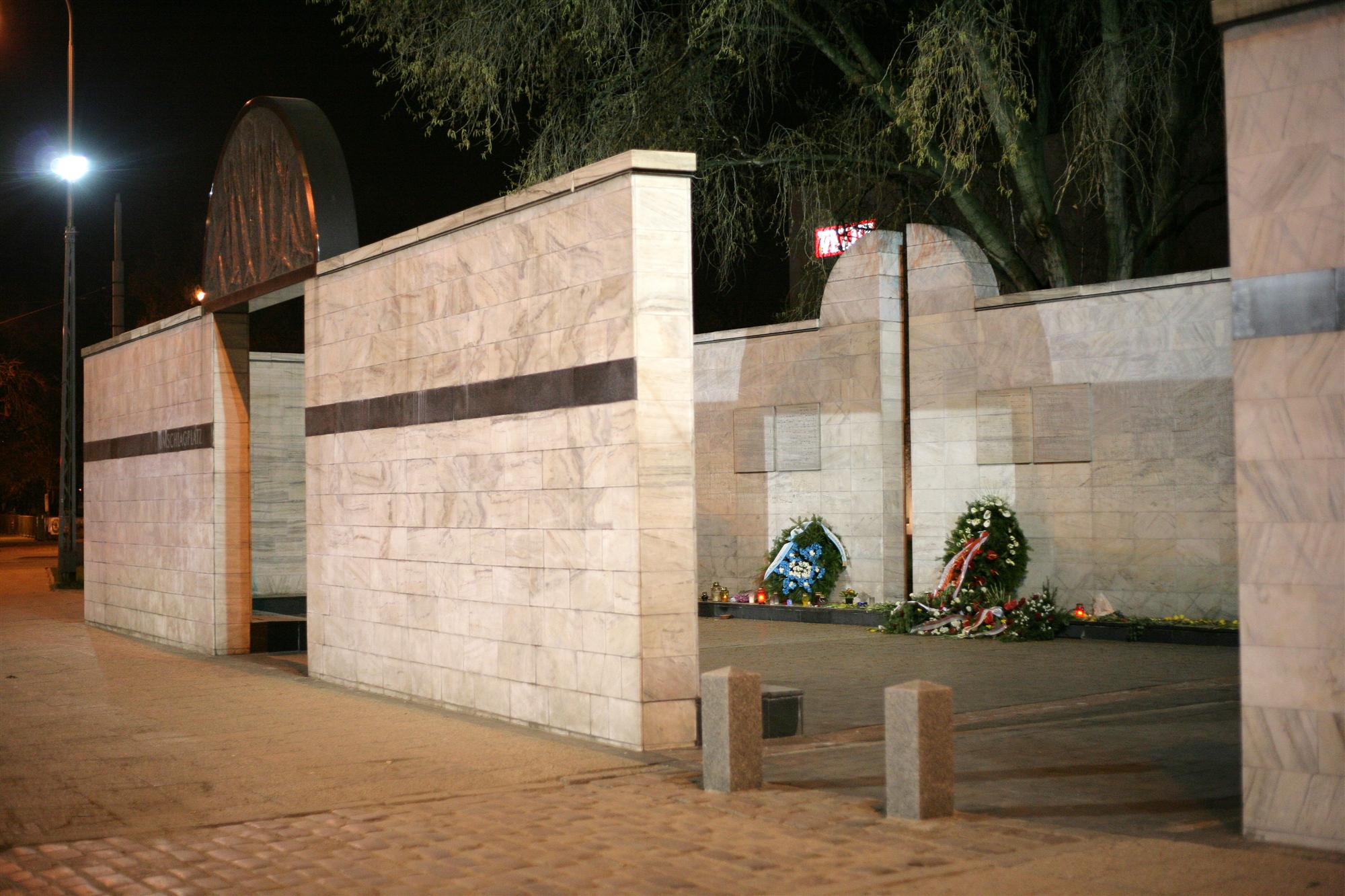
Memorial to Holocaust trains at the Umschlagplatz of the Warsaw Ghetto

All railway lines leading to death camps built in occupied Poland are ceremonially cut off from the existing railway system in the country, similar to the well-preserved arrival point at Auschwitz known as the "Judenrampe" platform. The commemorative monuments are traditionally erected at collection points elsewhere. In 1988, a national monument was created at the Umschlagplatz of the Warsaw Ghetto. Designed by architect Hanna Szmalenberg and sculptor Władysław Klamerus, it consists of a stone structure symbolizing an open freight car. In Kraków, the memorial to Jews from the Kraków Ghetto deported during the Holocaust spreads over the entire deportation site known as the Square of the Ghetto Heroes (Plac Bohaterow Getta). Inaugurated in December 2005, it consists of oversized steel chairs (each representing 1,000 victims), designed by architects Piotr Lewicki and Kazimierz Latak. At the former Łódź Ghetto, the monument was built at the Radegast train station (Bahnhof Radegast), where approximately 200,000 Polish, Austrian, German, Luxemburg and Czech Jews boarded the trains on the way to their deaths in the period from 16 January 1942, to 29 August 1944.

== See also ==
- Covered goods wagons in wartime deportations

=== Railway companies involved ===
- Deutsche Reichsbahn, the German Reich Railway
- CFR, the state railways of Romania
- MÁV, Hungarian State Railways
- BDZ (БДЖ), Bulgarian national Railways
- National Railway Company of Belgium, National Railway Company of Belgium
- Nederlandse Spoorwegen (NS) in the Netherlands
- Ostbahn, a railway operator set up by the General Government in occupied Poland
- SNCF, French National Railway Company

=== Memorials ===
- Wagon Monument (Netanya)
