= Ostbahn (General Government) =

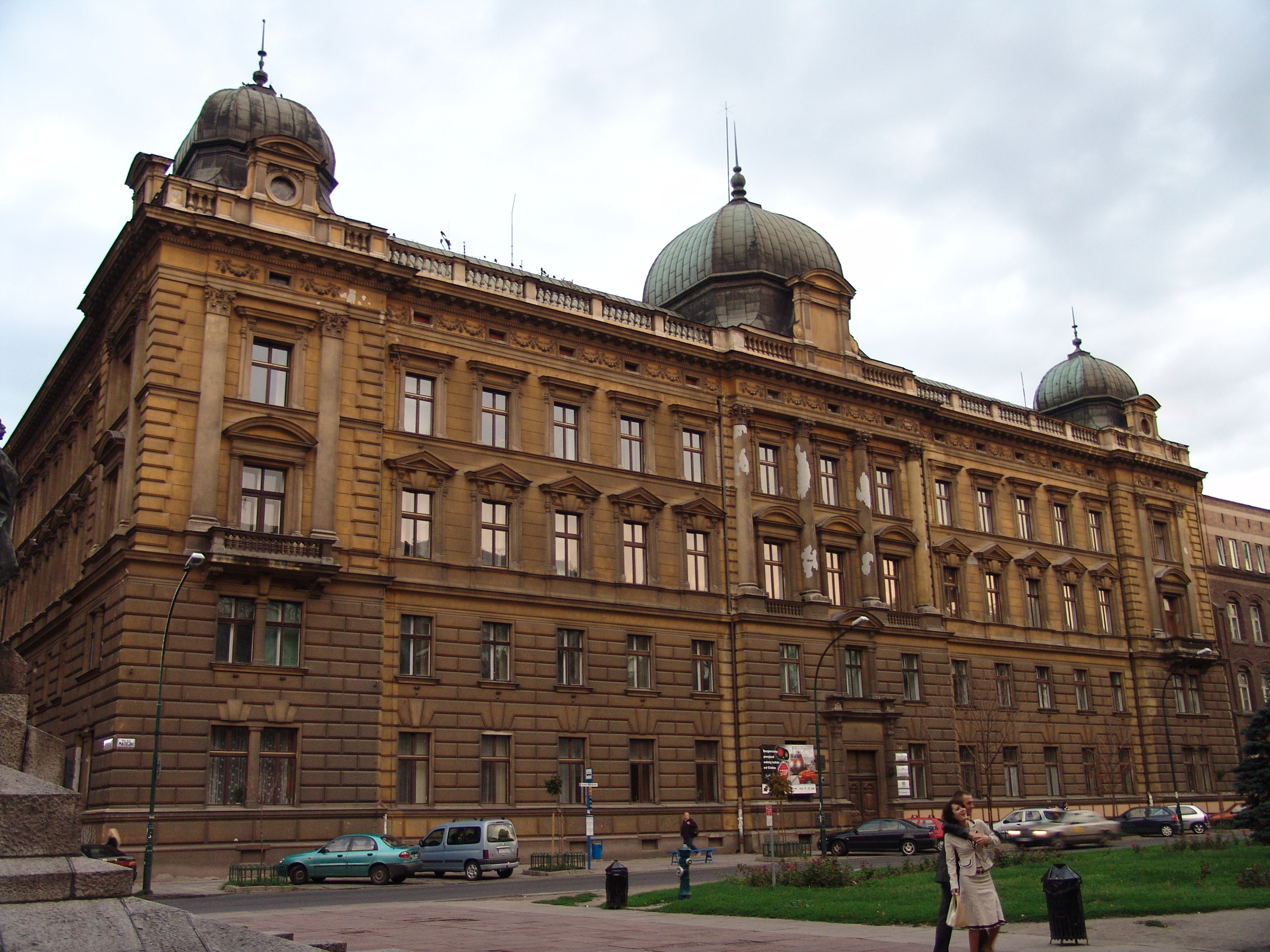
Headquarters of General Government Eastern Railways (Ostbahn) in Kraków at Plac Matejki

Ostbahn (German: Eastern Railway) in the General Government, were the Nazi German railways in occupied Poland during World War II, subordinated to the General Directorate of Eastern Railways (German: Generaldirektion der Ostbahn, Gedob) in occupied Kraków; a branch of the Deutsche Reichsbahn National Railway of Germany in the newly created Generalgouvernement territory under Hans Frank. The trains were used to cleanse and resettle interwar Poland with the German-speaking colonists in the name of "Lebensraum", and played an essential role in the mass deportations of Jews to extermination camps during the Holocaust.

== History ==
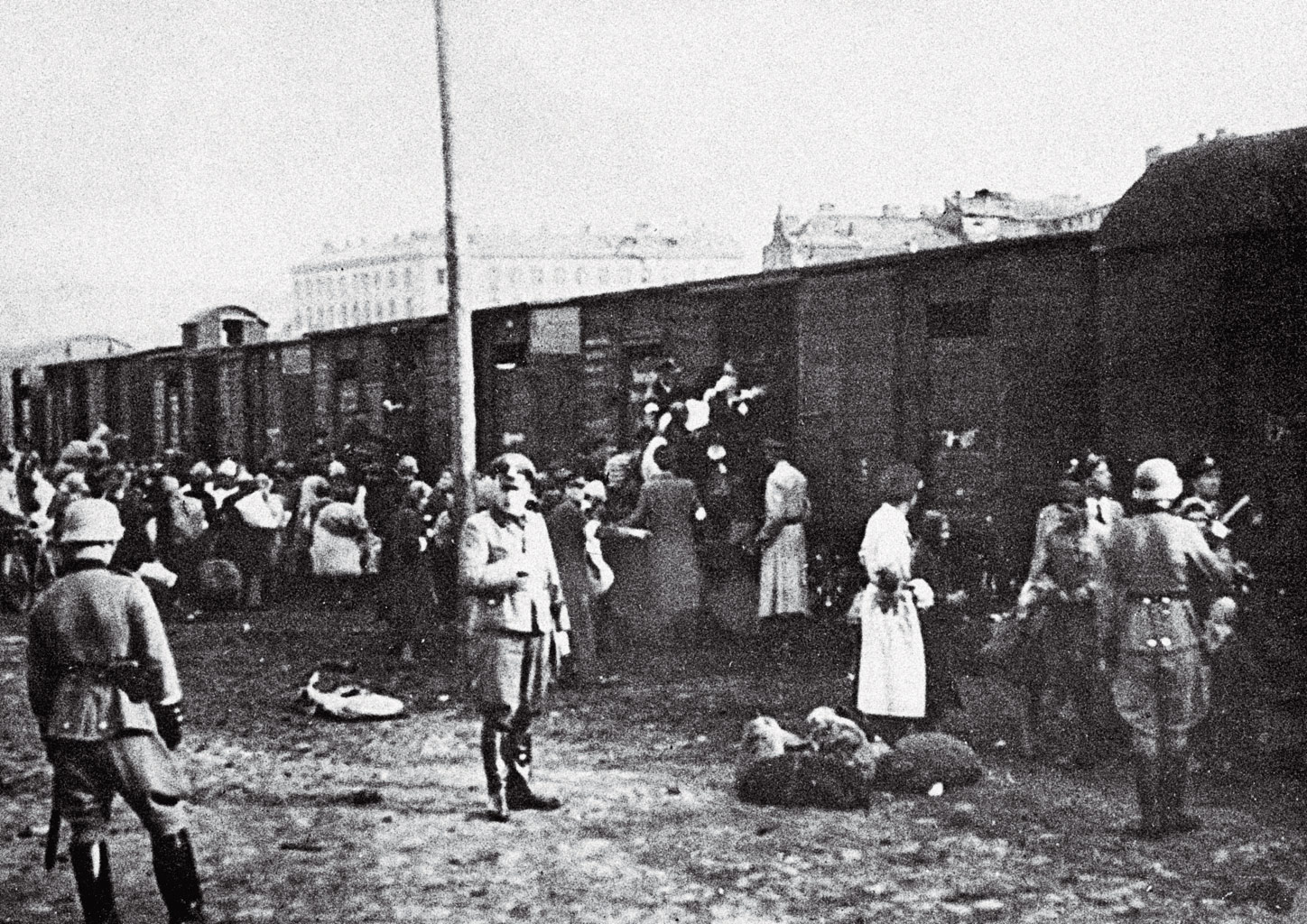
Polish Jews at the Umschlagplatz of the Warsaw Ghetto being loaded onto Holocaust trains run by Ostbahn, 1942. The site is preserved today as the Polish national monument.

Following invasion of Poland in September 1939 Nazi Germany disbanded Polish National Railways (PKP) immediately, and handed over their assets to the Deutsche Reichsbahn in Silesia, Greater Poland and in Pomerania. In November 1939, as soon as the semi-colonial General Government was set up in occupied central Poland, a separate branch of DRB called Generaldirektion der Ostbahn (Kolej Wschodnia in Polish) was established with headquarters called GEDOB in Kraków; all of the DRB branches existed outside Germany proper. The Ostbahn was granted 3,818 kilometres (2,372 mi) of railway lines (nearly doubled by 1941) and 505 km of narrow gauge, initially.

In December 1939, on the request of Hans Frank in Berlin, the Ostbahndirektion was given financial independence after paying back 10 million Reichsmarks to DRB. The removal of all bomb damage was completed in 1940. The Polish management was either executed in mass shooting actions (see: the 1939 Intelligenzaktion and the 1940 German AB-Aktion in Poland) or imprisoned at the Nazi concentration camps. Managerial jobs were staffed with German officials in a wave of some 8,000 instant promotions. The new Eastern Division of DRB acquired 7,192 kilometres (4,469 mi) of new railway lines and 1,052 km of (mostly industrial) narrow gauge in the annexed areas.
