= Resettlement to the East =

Nazi euphemism for the Final Solution

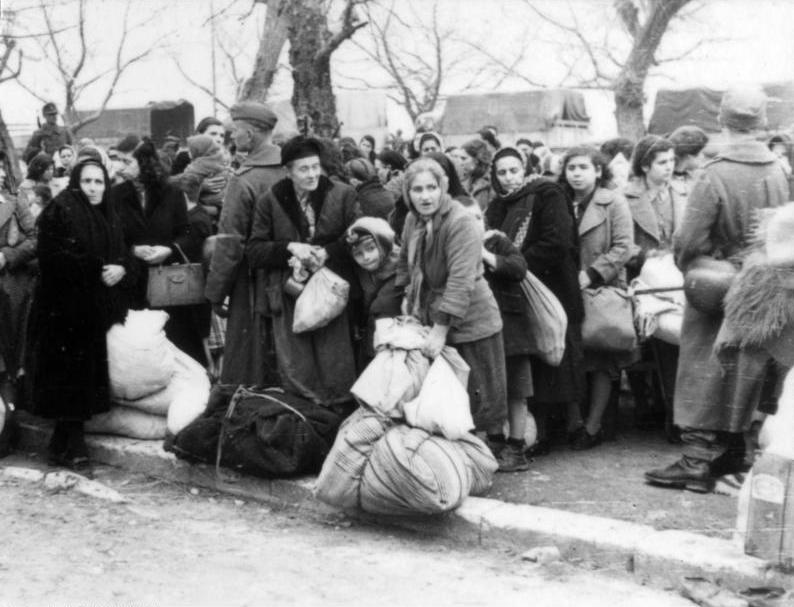
Deportation of Jews from Ioannina, Greece in March 1944

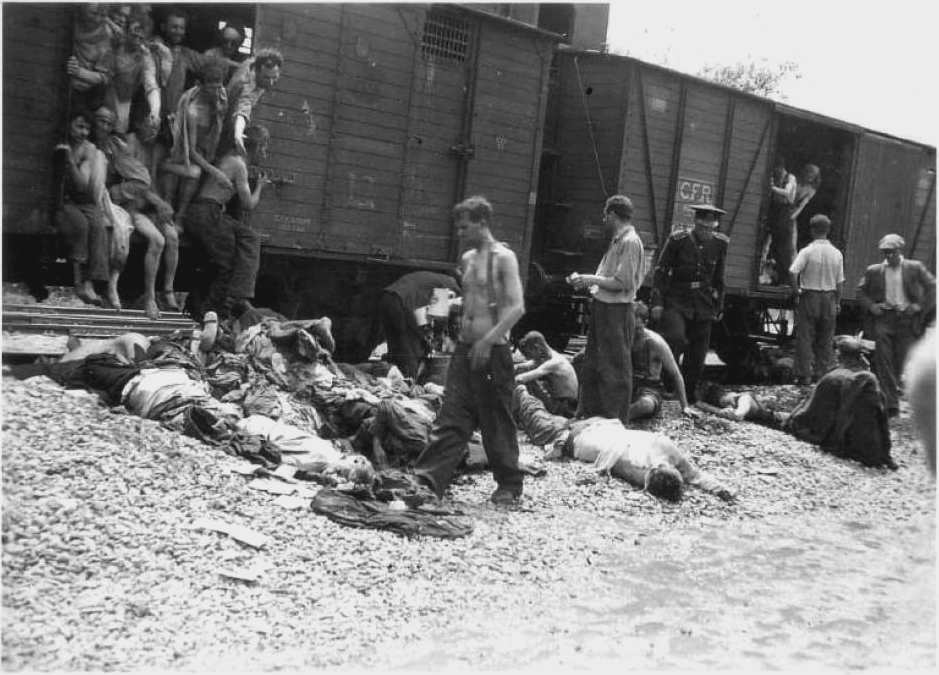
Pulling dead Jews from the Iași pogrom and Holocaust trains in Romania

Resettlement to the East (German: Umsiedlung nach (dem) Osten) was a Nazi euphemism which was used to refer to the deportation of Jews and others such as the Roma to extermination camps and other murder locations as part of the Final Solution. The Nazis used the euphemism as an attempt to fool their victims into thinking that they would be "resettled" somewhere else, usually in a labour camp, but not all of the victims believed the claim. The Germans also used the word "evacuation", implying preservation from danger and equally misleading to the victims. The Jews were granted a small luggage allowance, but the luggage was loaded separately, and it was often left at the station so it could be disposed of later, after the trains left. German Jews and their luggage were collected openly and in full view of the public before their transportation to the local railway station. To keep the lie credible, receipts were given, and the luggage was carried separately and collected from the victims after their murder.

== Holocaust trains ==
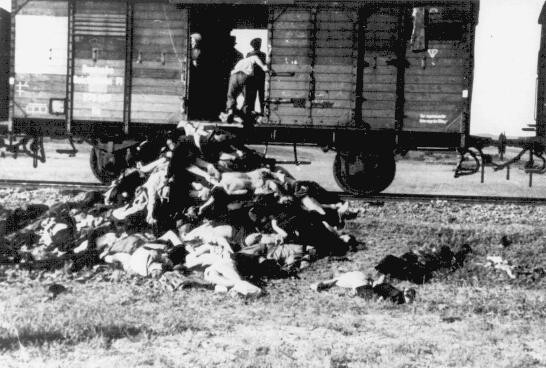
Romanians remove corpses of Jewish victims deported from Iași after a pogrom.

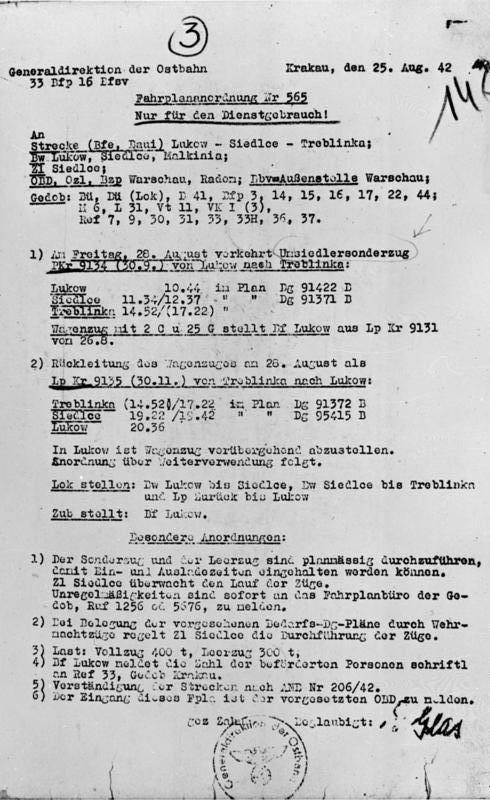
Nazi document detailing deportations to Treblinka extermination camp

Most of the victims were carried to their deaths by Reichsbahn trains in locked and windowless cattle wagons, with no sanitary arrangements (apart from a bucket in one corner) and nothing in the way of water or food apart from anything the victims brought with them. The wagons were designed to carry animals such as sheep and cattle and never to be used for carrying human beings. Each wagon was supposed by the Germans to carry just 50 persons but were normally packed with 100 to 150 victims, the gross overcrowding making sitting impossible and increasing their distress since everyone was forced to stand for long periods of time. Free movement was thus impossible, as well as any kind of exercise. The holocaust trains were given very low priority on the rail system, and many took several days to reach their grim destinations, so increasing the death rate on board. No provisions were supplied by the Germans who operated this inhumane system, and there were many deaths from dehydration leading to fainting, and then loss of consciousness followed by death. No attempts were made by the railway operators or railwaymen to relieve such extreme stresses on their passengers, people who had paid for their passage. However, similar treatments were used in concentration camps as a punishment for prisoners. The standard diet in these places (and ghettoes) was a starvation diet with fewer calories per day than was needed to sustain life.

The Holocaust trains were hired by Adolf Eichmann, and the Reichsbahn demanded one-way fares be paid by the victims although children below the age of four were allowed free travel to their deaths. The trains travelled to local death camps in German-occupied Poland at Chelmno, Belzec, Treblinka, Majdanek and Auschwitz-Birkenau, but the early trains in 1939 and 1940 also travelled to Nazi ghettos in the east, and the victims were usually murdered there by Einsatzgruppen organized by Reinhard Heydrich. Conditions on the Holocaust trains were so bad that many passengers died en route to the death camps especially as it often took many days to reach their destinations. The cattle cars in which the victims were carried were completely unheated in winter and unventilated in hot weather and so the passengers were exposed to dehydration, hypothermia or heat stroke. Deaths among the elderly, children and sick were very common, and the bodies were removed whenever a stop occurred. To maintain the deception, some passengers were given postcards by the guards to send to their relatives with dictated words about their successful "resettlement". That deception continued even to the death camps, such as with a bogus station at Treblinka and Sobibor camps that was complete with signs, a station clock (with a fixed time painted in) and flower tubs to reassure the victims who debouched there.

== Einsatzgruppen ==
Einsatzgruppen reports even listed Jews who had been executed locally as having been "resettled": "the euphemistic term "resettled" (ausgesiedelt) was understood to mean something else (erschossen or hingerichtet / shot or executed)". During the war, the Polish underground press already warned foreign media not to accept the claim of resettlement at face value. Holocaust deniers claim that the use of the phrase in Nazi documents refers to the actual resettlement of Jews, rather than their murder, but those claims are rejected by historians.

== See also ==
- Final Solution
- Holocaust
- Holocaust trains
- Reichsbahn
- Pogrom
