= Brussels massacre =

1370 killing of Jews in Brussels, present-day Belgium

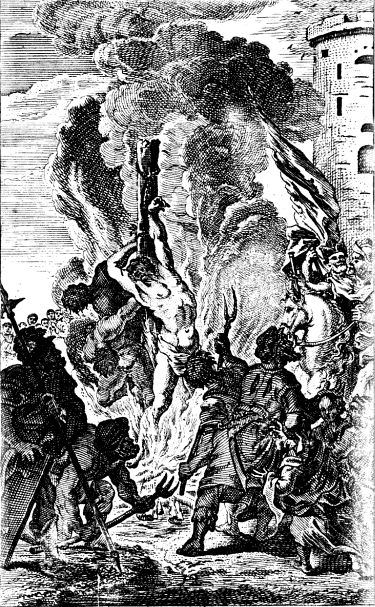
- Ignis hostes tuos devoret. Depiction of the execution of the Jews accused of host desecration in Brussels, by Jacobus Harrewijn (circa 1720). Based on a tapestry from the Van Helmont atelier.
- Date: May 22, 1370
- Location: Brussels (Duchy of Brabant); 50°51′N 4°21′E
- Cause: Anti-Semitism (Alleged host desecration at the Brussels synagogue)
- Deaths: 6–20 Jews

The Brussels massacre was an antisemitic episode in Brussels (then within the Duchy of Brabant) in 1370 in connection with an alleged host desecration at the Brussels synagogue. In May 1370, a number of Jews, variously given as six or about twenty, were executed or otherwise killed, while the rest of the small community was banished. Many Jews from then on migrated further east to both modern day Germany and the Polish–Lithuanian Commonwealth.

The supposedly recovered hosts became objects of veneration for local Christians as the Sacrament of Miracle. The cult survived until after the Second World War and the Holocaust, after which its antisemitic elements pushed the local church to derecognise it. It was claimed that the hosts had been stabbed by Jews and had miraculously shed blood, but been otherwise unharmed. The reliquary (without the hosts) is currently preserved in the cathedral's treasury (the hosts may have been present inside it as late as the year 2000).

== Background ==
Black Death Jewish persecutions had previously destroyed Brussels' Jewish community in 1350. According to Premonstratensian historian Placide Lefèvre, contemporary treasury records indicate that by 1370 there were eight Jewish households in Brussels and two in Leuven.

In 1369, two priests in Brussels were arrested for usury and turned over to the ecclesiastical tribunal of the Church of St. Michael and St. Gudula (now the cathedral) for investigation: it transpired that they had attempted to circumvent usury prohibitions by lending money to a Jew named Mesterman who in turn lent it out at interest. The clerical usury scandal in Brussels was the immediate context of the accusations of host desecration, a common antisemitic canard in medieval Europe, with wafers that Jews had supposedly tried to profane often said to have been miraculously spared from harm.

== Allegations ==
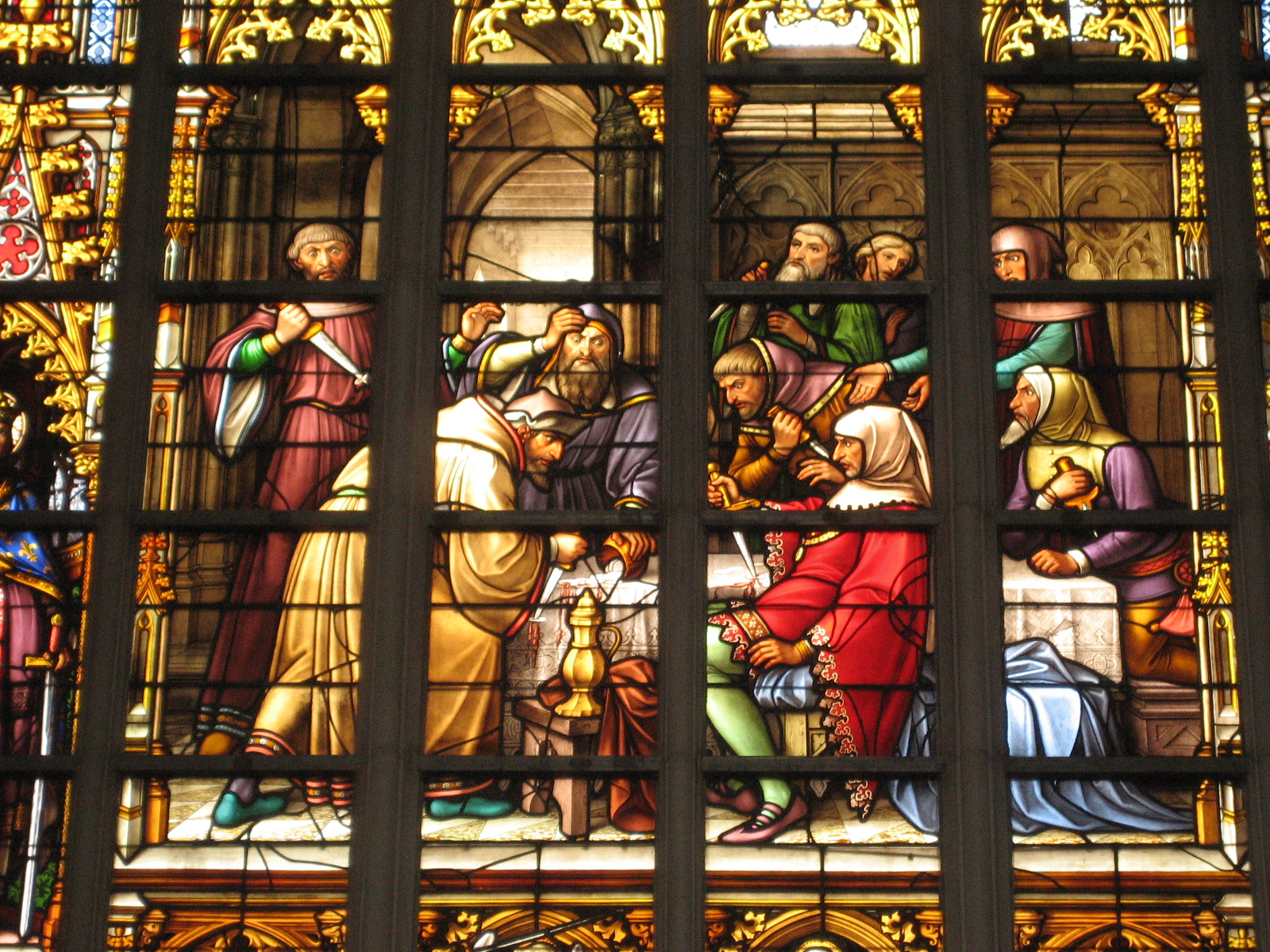
19th-century depiction of the alleged profanation, in the Cathedral of St. Michael and St. Gudula in Brussels.

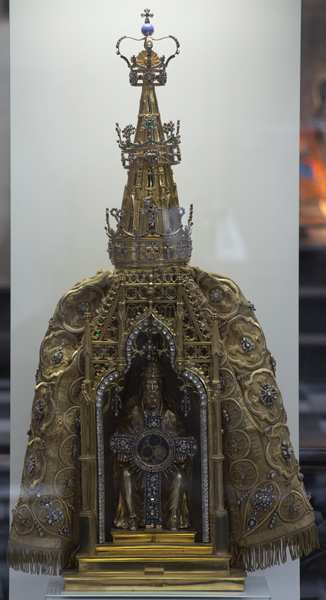
The reliquary of the Sacrament of Miracle, used to contain three hosts said to have been desecrated by Jews in 1370.

The version of the allegations attested from 1403 was that a rich Jew from Enghien wanted to obtain some consecrated hosts to profane, and bribed a male Jewish convert to Christianity from Leuven to steal some. Shortly thereafter, the Enghien merchant was murdered. His widow passed the stolen hosts to the Jews of Brussels, where in the synagogue on Good Friday 1370 some tried to stab the wafers with their daggers, causing blood to pour forth. A female Jewish convert to Christianity was paid to take the hosts to Cologne's Jews, but remorsefully told the story to the parson of Notre-Dame de la Chapelle in Brussels, who took possession of the hosts. The Duke of Brabant (absent during the trial), (Note: In fact, in 1370 Joanna was suo jure Duchess of the Duchy of Brabant.) on the woman's testimony, ordered the stabbers burnt at the stake and the remaining Jews banished, with their property confiscated.

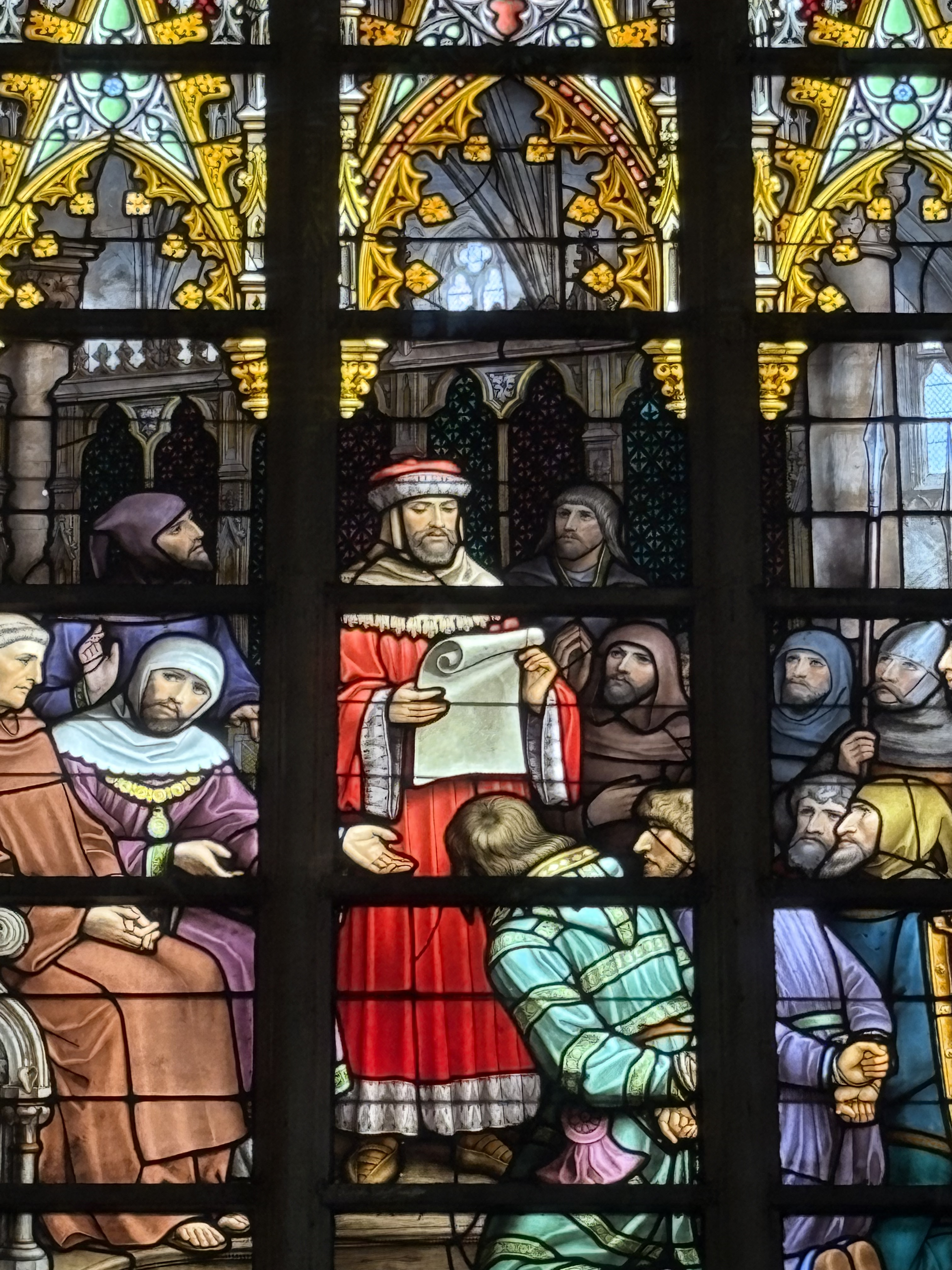
The Amman (judge) reads the death sentence.

== Cult of the Miracle ==
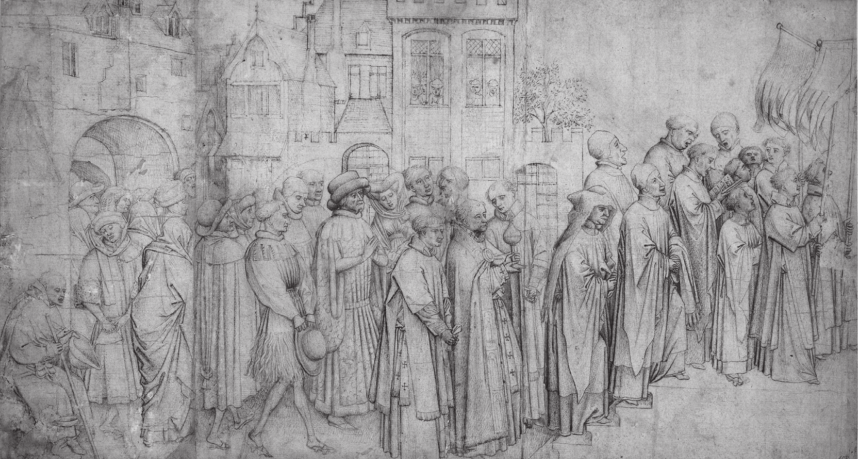
Procession with the Sacrament of Miracle, ink drawing by Vrancke van der Stockt, circa 1450–1460.

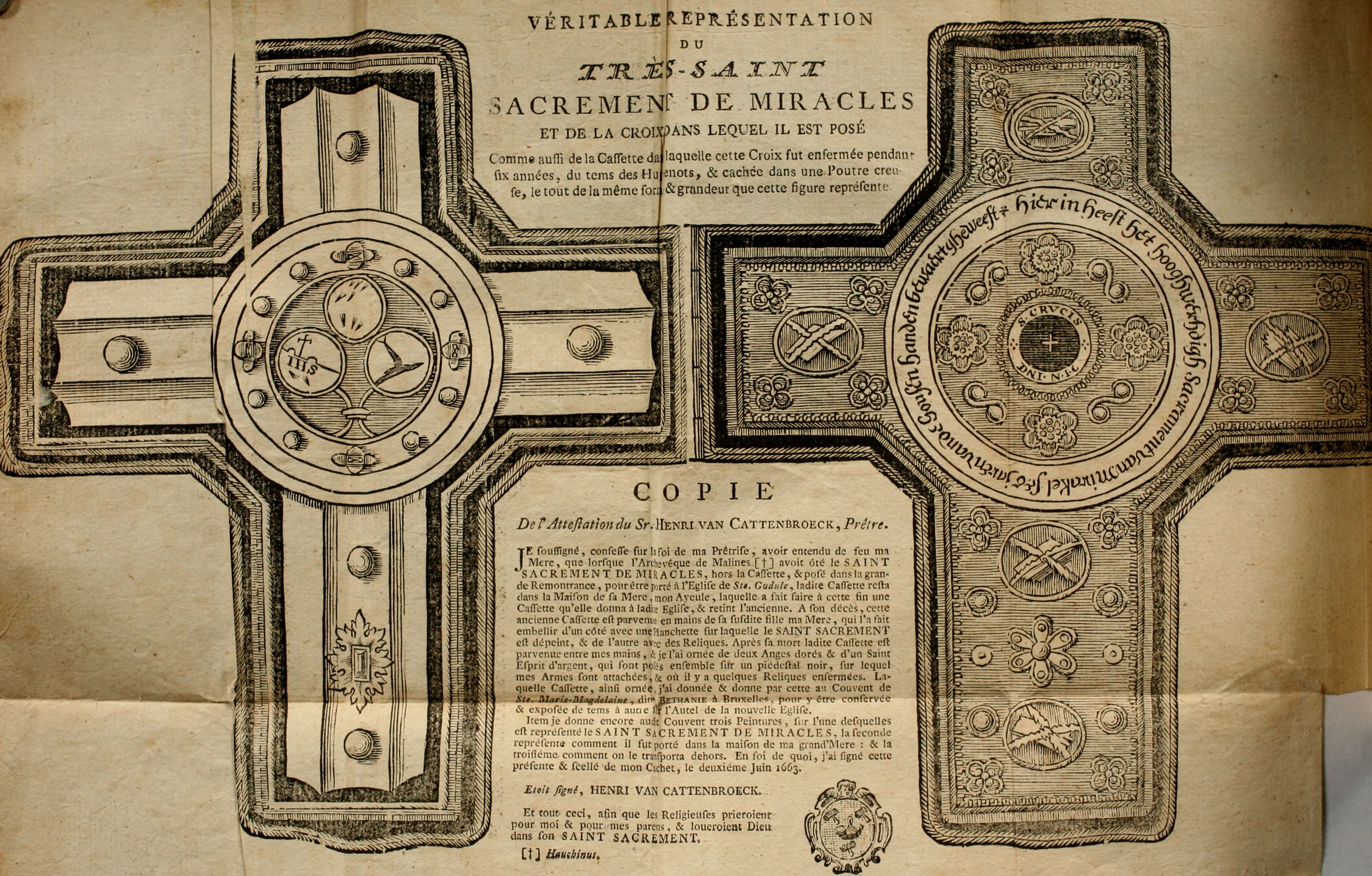
Representation of the reliquary of the Blessed Sacrament of Miracle, and of the three hosts, made on the occasion of the 400 years jubilee.

The hosts were placed in reliquaries and preserved in the then collegiate church of Saint Gudula, the patron saint of Brussels. They became a feature of the annual procession on her feast day.

Emperor Charles V and the Habsburgs, as well as their relatives, donated seven stained glass windows on which the miracle is depicted. These were executed by Antwerp glass-maker Jan Hack to designs by Bernard van Orley and Michiel Coxie. Four of them are still in place today. This compared perceived Jewish anti-Catholicism to the nascent Protestant Reformation, with the miraculous bleeding countering Protestant denials of transubstantiation.

In the early 1580s, during a period of Calvinist rule in Brussels, all Catholic ceremonies were suppressed. From 1579 to 1585 the relics were hidden in a house in the Korte Ridderstraat. After the end of Calvinist rule in 1585, a procession of citizens and officeholders retrieved the hosts and carried them back to the church. The re-emergence of the cult in 1585 was primarily as a celebration of the end of Calvinist rule. The Archdukes Albert and Isabella, who ruled in Brussels 1598–1621, made the annual procession a state occasion:

The Blessed Sacrament of Miracles ... had emerged as doubly miraculous after the end of Calvinist rule in Brussels in 1585 when it became clear that the sacred hosts had survived intact. The annual procession in honour of the Sacrament now became as much a commemoration of the second anti-Calvinist miracle as of the first anti-Semitic one and, after their accession, the Archdukes conscientiously attended the procession every year while also turning it into a veritable state event.

Five windows added in the nineteenth century depict the development of the cult of the Miracle; these were donated by Belgian kings Leopold I and Leopold II and other nobles, this time linking the Miracle to the contemporary Catholic opposition to secularism.

The 1870 quincentenary of the Miracle was to have been marked with celebrations, but these were cancelled due to political tensions between Catholics and Liberals in an election year. Liberals, including the later antisemite Edmond Picard, had called for a boycott of the festivities. A pamphlet by Charles Potvin (under the pseudonym Dom Liber) gave rise to a violent controversy with the young priest Hyacinthe De Bruyn, as well as a number of historical essays contextualising the massacre and the later celebrations.

== Retraction ==
After the Second World War, in light of the mass murder of Belgian Jews during the Holocaust, the antisemitic elements of the cult were de-emphasised. In 1968, in the wake of Nostra aetate issued by the Second Vatican Council, the Archdiocese of Mechelen-Brussels officially derecognised the cult. In 1977 Cardinal Leo Joseph Suenens installed a plaque in the cathedral to highlight this. On 16 November 2006, at the inauguration of the exhibit Menorah in the Cathedral by Jean Paul Leon presented by the Jewish Museum of Belgium, Monsignor Jozef De Kesel addressed the attendees and Albert Guigui as Chief Rabbi of the Great Synagogue of Europe and apologised for the commemoration of the Brussels massacre on the windows of the Cathedral. The former chapel of the Sacrament of Miracle is now the cathedral museum which exhibits its treasures, including the former reliquaries with contextual information.

== See also ==
- History of the Jews in Belgium
- List of massacres in Belgium
- Martyrdom in Judaism
