= Ochse =

Ochse can refer to the Ochsen, a mountain in Switzerland

Ochse is a German language surname. It stem from the German word Ochse for "ox" and was probably used as a nickname for a strong or lumbering individual. Notable people with the name include:

- Arthur Edward Ochse (1870–1918), South African cricketer
- Arthur Lennox Ochse (1899–1949), South African cricketer
- Chum Ochse (1925–1996), South African rugby player
- Fernand Ochsé (1879–1944), French designer, dandy, author, composer and painter
- Hildegard Ochse (1935–1997), German photographer
- Jacob Jonas Ochse (1892–1970), Dutch botanist
- Louise Ochsé (1884–1944), Franco-Belgian sculptor
- Weston Ochse (1965), American author and educator

== See also ==
- Ochs (surname)
