= Louise Ochsé =

Belgian sculptor

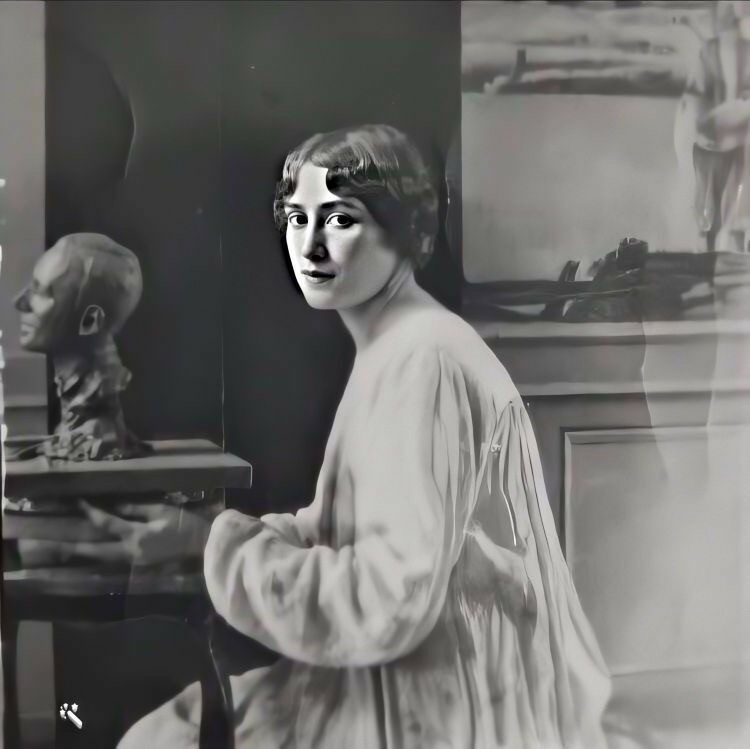
- Born: Louise Mayer; 13 June 1884; Forest, Belgium
- Died: 1 August 1944 (aged 60); Auschwitz concentration camp

Louise Ochsé (13 June 1884 – 1 August 1944) was a Franco-Belgian sculptor born in the suburbs of Brussels, Belgium, at the end of the 19th century. Initially she studied under Constantin Meunier. She moved to Paris and exhibited her works at the Salon de la Société Nationale des Beaux-Arts between 1905 and 1914 and at the Salon de la Libre Esthétique from 1906 to 1912. On the occasion of her exhibit at the Galerie Boutet de Monvel in 1912, the poet and writer Guillaume Apollinaire praised her work. Examples of her art include a bust of Maurice Ravel which now is exhibited at the composer Maurice Ravel museum in the town of Montfort-L'Amaury, outside of Paris, and a bronze mask of composer Claude Debussy which was exhibited at the Musée d'Orsay October 2008 to February 2009. A bronze plaque entitled Challenge de Gramont is on display at the Fogg Museum.

She was the granddaughter of Elie Aristide Astruc and niece of Gabriel Astruc, journalist, impresario and founder of the Théâtre des Champs-Élysées. In 1906, Ochse married the French poet and writer Julien Ochsé, recipient of the Prix Davaine of the Académie Française. In 1912, she served as a model for her brother-in-law, the French illustrator known as "Drian". Following the death of her husband in 1936, she married her brother-in-law, Fernand Ochsé, a multi-talented decorator, theater set designer, composer and painter, and close friend of other artists such French violinist Henri Casadesus and well-known composers Arthur Honegger, Maurice Ravel and Reynaldo Hahn.

Louise and Fernand Ochsé were arrested by the Gestapo in July 1944 in Cannes where they were in hiding. Both were deported to Auschwitz concentration camp from Drancy internment camp on 31 July 1944. Their last permanent residence was in Paris at 7, rue de L'Estrapade.
