= National Memorial to the Jewish Martyrs of Belgium =

- Mémorial National aux Martyrs Juifs de Belgique (French); Nationaal Gedenkteken der Joodse Martelaren van België (Dutch)
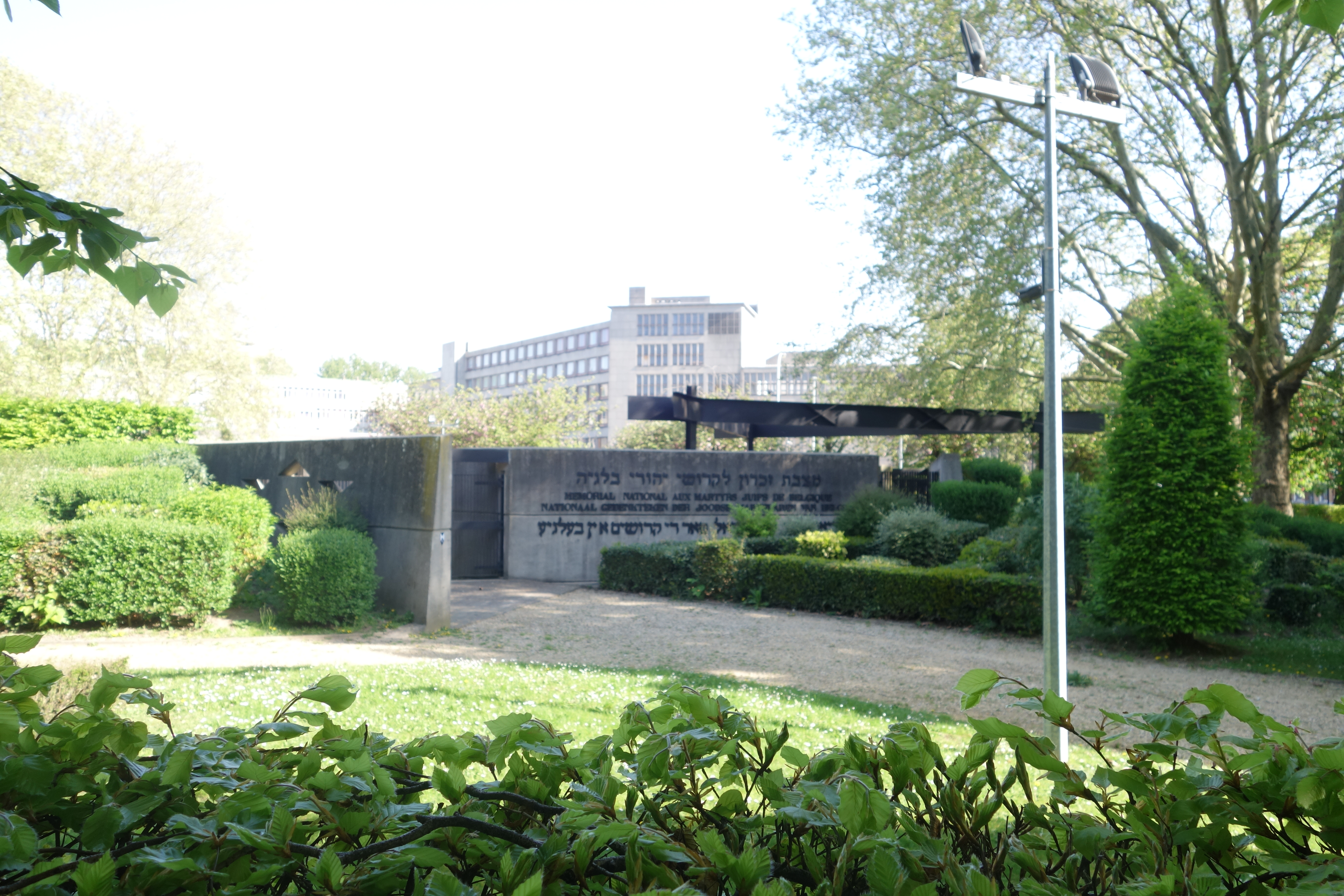
- Entrance of the National Memorial to the Jewish Martyrs of Belgium seen from the Square des Martyrs Juifs/Joodse-Martelarensquare
- Interactive map of National Memorial to the Jewish Martyrs of Belgium
- Location: Brussels, Belgium
- Coordinates: 50°50′12″N 4°19′26″E
- Designer: André Godart; Odon Dupire; Abraham Lipski; Jacques Lewin
- Type: Holocaust memorial
- Material: Concrete
- Beginning date: 28 March 1965
- Inauguration date: 19 April 1970; 56 years ago
- Restored date: 2012–2013
- Dedicated to: Jewish victims of the Holocaust

The National Memorial to the Jewish Martyrs of Belgium (French: Mémorial National aux Martyrs Juifs de Belgique; Dutch: Nationaal Gedenkteken der Joodse Martelaren van België) is a Holocaust memorial in Anderlecht, a municipality of Brussels, Belgium. It commemorates the Jewish victims of the Holocaust in Belgium during the Second World War.

The memorial was designed in 1964 by architect André Godart, in collaboration with architect Odon Dupire and consulting engineers Abraham Lipski and Jacques Lewin, and built between 1968–1970. The memorial was designated a historic monument 23 October 2003 and is open to visitors by appointment only.

The memorial is located on the Square des Martyrs Juifs/Joodse-Martelarensquare (lit. 'Jewish Martyrs Square'), in Cureghem.

== History ==
=== Early history (1956–1963) ===
Founded in 1956, the Union des Déportés Juifs de Belgique (lit. 'Union of Jewish Deportees from Belgium'), launched the initiative to create a national memorial for the Jewish victims of the Second World War. One of its main goals was to recognise the Jewish community as a distinct victim group of the Nazi regime. In 1961, following a visit by the Union, then chaired by Maurice Pioro, to the Mémorial au Martyr Juif Inconnu in Paris, the idea for a Belgian national memorial took shape. The association initially planned to transform the Kazerne Dossin in Mechelen into a memorial, but the high purchase price made this impossible. The municipality of Anderlecht, on the initiative of its mayor Joseph Bracops, a survivor of Auschwitz and Ebensee, provided a parcel of land in Cureghem. The choice of this site reflected both the area’s historical role as a centre of Jewish immigration in the early 20th century and Bracops’s personal involvement.

=== Construction and inauguration (1964–1970) ===
On 13 March 1964, the organising committee of the memorial and the Royal Federation of Belgian Societies of Architects (FAB) launched a competition. Twenty-four projects were submitted, and the project by architects André Godart and Odon Dupire was selected. Their plan featured a 500 m² sacred space in the shape of a hexagon, intended for use as an open-air synagogue. The nearly perfect hexagonal structure references the Star of David and symbolises a broken community. Surrounding three-metre-high walls are clad in 108 black granite panels with the names of 23,838 Jews deported from the Dossin Barracks in Mechelen and murdered in the extermination camps.

The first stone was laid on 28 March 1965, with an urn containing ashes from Auschwitz placed inside. On 18 August 1966, Marc Goldberg, secretary of the National Committee, outlined in a memorandum that the memorial should serve as a place of reflection and prayer and honour both resistance efforts and those who helped save nearly 20,000 Jews. The memorial was inaugurated on 19 April 1970 to mark the Warsaw Ghetto Uprising anniversary, in the presence of Prime Minister Gaston Eyskens and other dignitaries.

=== Later history (1971–2000) ===
On 9 August 1972, the Foundation for the National Memorial of the Jewish Martyrs of Belgium (French: Fondation Mémorial National aux Martyrs Juifs de Belgique; Dutch: Stichting Nationaal Gedenkteken der Joodse Martelaren van België), was established to oversee the memorial, initially co-chaired by Maurice Pioro and Antwerp diamond merchant Joseph Komkommer, later succeeded by Claude Marinower. On 22 March 1978, two national committees were created to design monuments honouring the Jewish Resistance and the Righteous Among the Nations, by the Central Israelite Consistory of Belgium.

The Tribute Committee of Rescuers, chaired by Rik Szyffer, prepared a ceremony to honour non-Jewish Belgians who had helped Jews survive. Dov Lieberman, the committee’s secretary, recalled the 1946 ceremony at the Centre of Fine Arts in Brussels, attended by Queen Elisabeth of Bavaria, ministers, and political leaders, noting that Sophie Schneebalg compiled a list of about 1,600 rescuers. Efforts continued to identify all rescuers who had hidden roughly 18,000 Jews, with a major tribute planned for 1980 to mark the 150th anniversary of Belgian independence. Around 1,500 rescuers or their families received bronze medals from Yad Vashem as “Righteous Among the Nations,” and their names were inscribed in the Garden of the Righteous Among the Nations in Jerusalem.

Maurice Pioro proposed expanding the National Memorial of Anderlecht to include a stone engraved with the names of Belgian Jewish resistance members killed during World War II. The Committee for Tribute to the Heroes, chaired by Professor Chaïm Perelman, had compiled the list of 245 resistance members. The Monument to the Jewish Resistance, designed by André Godart, was inaugurated on 6 May 1979, and six flames above the monument represent the six million Jewish Holocaust victims.

=== 21st century ===
==== Protection and renovation (2001–2019) ====
The memorial was protected as a monument on 23 October 2003. It underwent restoration in 2012–2013 by the architecture firm Origin, which included cleaning the marble plaques, repairing concrete and metal structures, and making the altar water-resistant. The crypt was also converted into a didactic space operated by the Jewish Museum of Belgium, allowing visitors and school groups to explore digital archives and view Holocaust documentaries. The project, coordinated by Isidore Zielonka, was funded 80% by the Brussels-Capital Region and 20% by the Foundation for the Memorial.

==== Redevelopment (2020–present) ====
In 2020 marked the 50th anniversary of the National Memorial to the Jewish Martyrs of Belgium. As of 2021, a redevelopment plan as part of the Sustainable Neighbourhood Contract Canal-South, was approved by Beliris, the Royal Commission for Monuments and Landscapes, and the municipality of Anderlecht. The plan includes a Wall of the Righteous, and the Monument for the Heroes will be dismantled and relocated. Works began on 2 June 2025 and are expected to take two years.

== Description ==
The memorial consists of tall reinforced exposed concrete walls arranged in a hexagonal plan, enclosing a reflective inner space for open-air ceremonies, surrounded by terraces with triangular tiles. The main entrance, in the southeastern wall, consists of three openings separated by perpendicular concrete panels, accessed via a set of stairways. On the exterior, the monument’s name is displayed in Hebrew, French, and Dutch. To the left, the longer southwestern wall features a horizontally stretched Star of David motif that appears in classical proportion when viewed from the street, and all entrances are secured by vertical metal grilles.

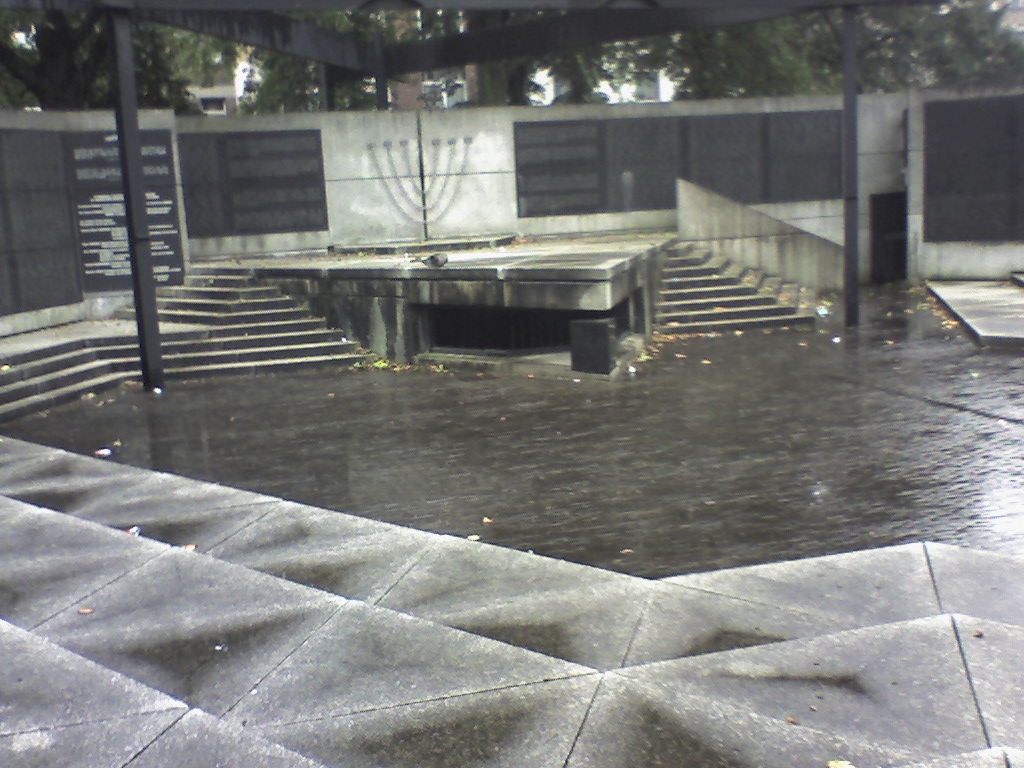
Altar, with the crypt’s window visible beneath, the chain menorah on the wall, and the Wall of Names in the background.

=== Walls of names ===
The partially buried concrete walls maintain a horizontal expression and follow the hexagonal layout referencing the Star of David. Granite slabs on the three-metre-high interior walls are engraved with the names of the 23,838 Jewish victims deported from Kazerne Dossin to extermination camps.

=== Altar ===
Facing east, a triangular altar with side stairways is topped by a triangular steel structure that, with the platform, forms a Star of David. Originally intended to reference camp barracks and be covered with a ceremonial veil, the design was never completed. Behind the platform, a wall displays a menorah made of six steel chains symbolising the six million Holocaust victims. In front, a black urn once contained ashes from Auschwitz-Birkenau, removed in 2006 following vandalism.

=== Crypt ===
Beneath the altar, a crypt accessible from the right side is illuminated by a three-part window at the triangle’s point. Originally housing testimonies, a guestbook, and scrolls listing deported martyrs from other countries, it suffered repeated vandalism. It now serves as an educational space with two oil lamps, one containing ashes returned from Auschwitz-Birkenau after 2006, artistic installations by Serge Helholc, paintings by Moshé Macchias, books on Judaism, and commemorative plaques for the memorial’s presidents and administrators.

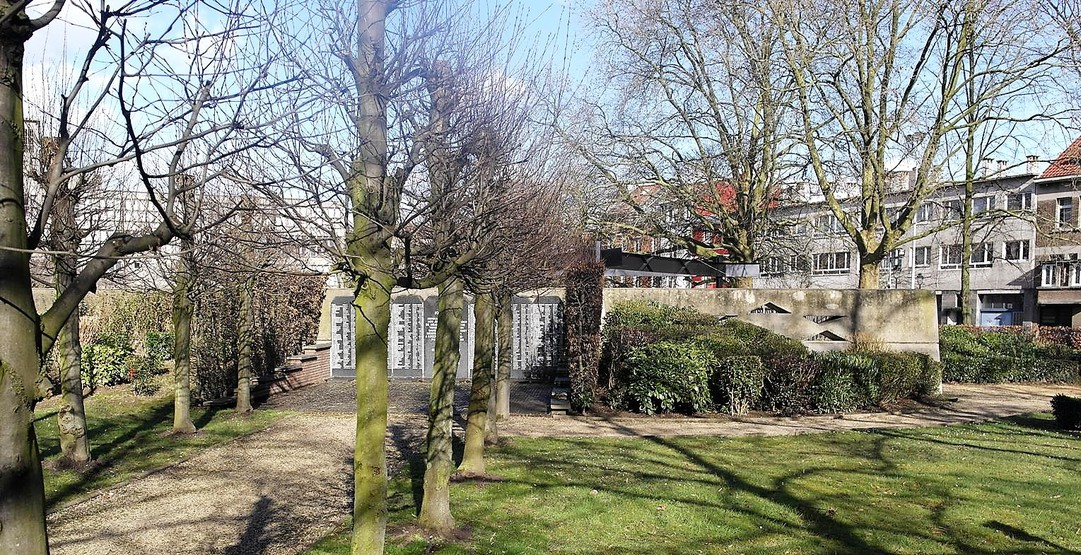
Monument to the Jewish Resistance Fighters seen from Square des Martyrs Juifs.

=== Monument to the Jewish Resistance Fighters ===
In 1972, two national commissions established a monument to honour Belgian Jewish resistance fighters. It consists of six marble plaques engraved with the names of 245 fighters, originally on the memorial’s exterior wall, and will be relocated alongside a planned Monument to the Righteous Among the Nations.

=== Redevelopment ===
As part of a redevelopment plan, the memorial will be restored and its surroundings improved. The existing rectangular hedge, which obscures the monument, will be replaced with a lower double hedge following the memorial’s hexagonal geometry. Plantings on surrounding slopes will be cleared to make the walls fully visible, with grassy embankments restored as the memorial's base.

The surroundings and contours of the memorial will be restructured to improve visibility and integrate it harmoniously into the park. A new pathway will replace informal trails, and a concrete wall will host the relocated Monument to the Jewish Resistance Fighters alongside a future Monument to the Righteous Among the Nations. A new entrance gate, inspired by the memorial’s original design, will complete the project, aiming to respect André Godart’s vision and enhance accessibility and visibility.
