= Jewish cemetery, Bayonne =

Jewish cemetery in Bayonne, Nouvelle-Aquitaine, France

- Cimetière juif de Bayonne
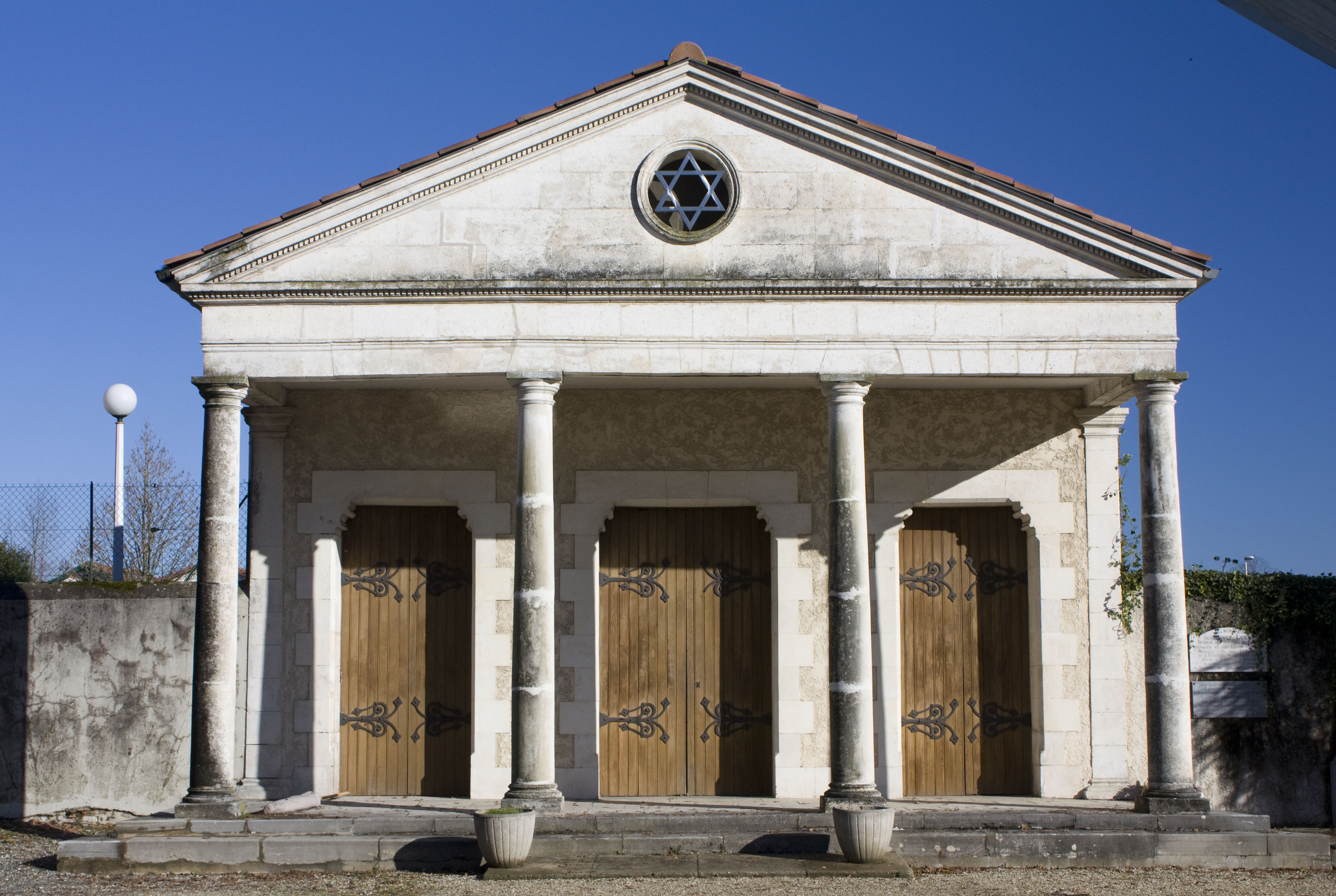
- Interactive map of Jewish cemetery, Bayonne

Details
- Established: 1689
- Location: Bayonne, Nouvelle-Aquitaine
- Country: France
- Coordinates: 43°30′14″N 1°27′58″W
- Owned by: Association cultuelle israélite de Bayonne
- Size: 2 ha
- No. of graves: About 3000

The Jewish (or Israelite) cemetery of Bayonne is a Jewish cemetery located in Bayonne, Nouvelle-Aquitaine. It is located in the Saint-Étienne quarter in the northern part of the city and north of the synagogue.

== History ==
The Jewish cemetery of Bayonne was established in 1689 in the Saint-Étienne neighborhood in the northern quarter of the city. It was remodeled and enlarged in the 18th and 19th century and covers and area of two hectares. A depository built in the style of the Temple in Jerusalem was inaugurated in 1862.

It was a theatre of battle during the 1814 siege of Bayonne.

In spring 2010, the Jewish Museum of Belgium began a restoration project for the cemetery. No less than nine other summer projects allowed young European volunteers, including members of the Action Reconciliation Service for Peace, to uncover hundreds of headstones, covering a period burials from 1654 to 1806. The cemetery is owned by the Israelite Cultural Association of Bayonne.

== Description ==
The cemetery was listed as a monument historique on July 15, 1998. It is the oldest Jewish cemetery in France, and has conserved numerous ancient headstones — nearly 3000 dating back to the 18th and 19th centuries. The depository from 1862 in the style of the ancient Temple has also been classified as a monument historique.

The Jewish Cemetery of Bayonne

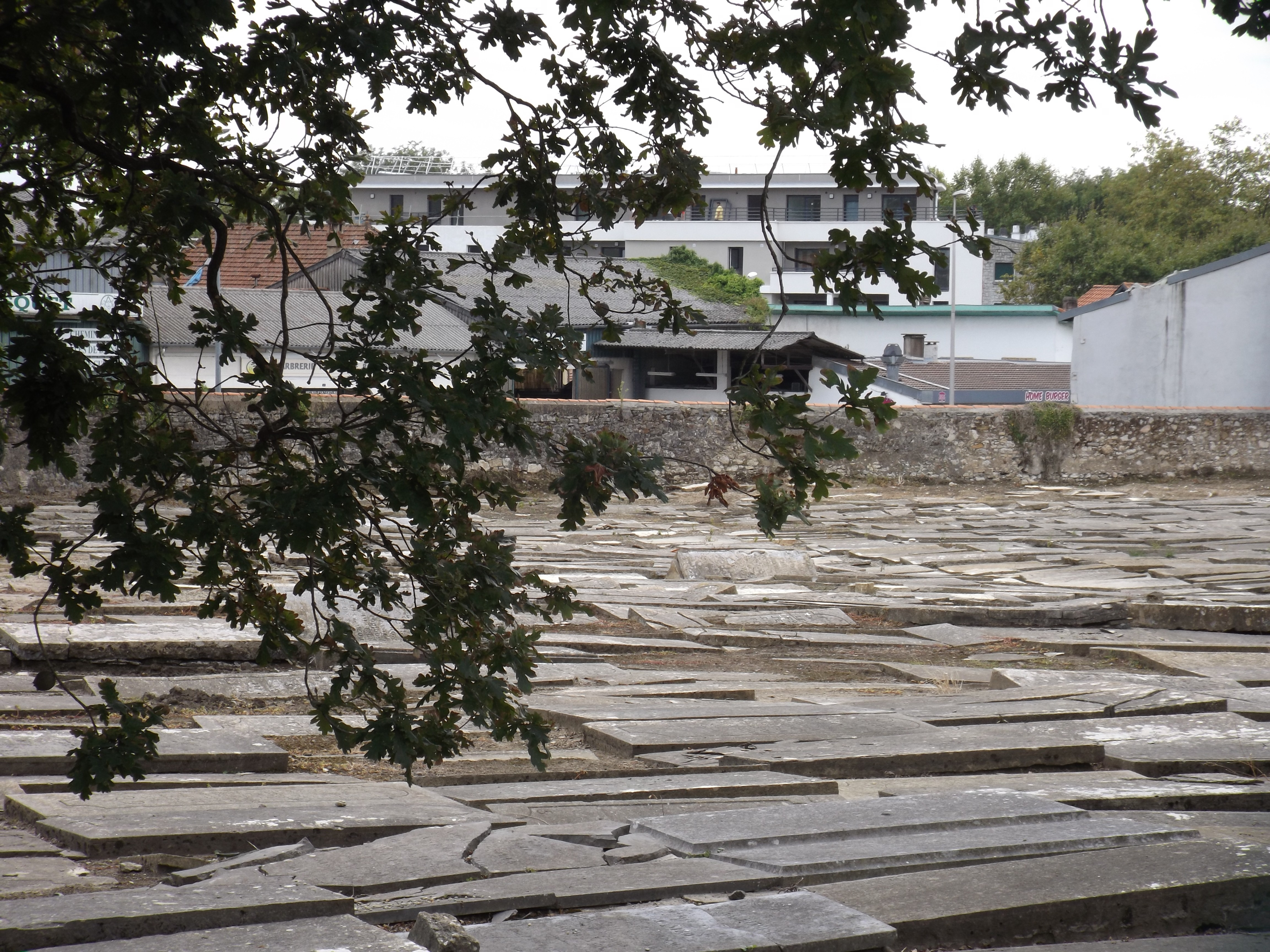
The 19th Century Section

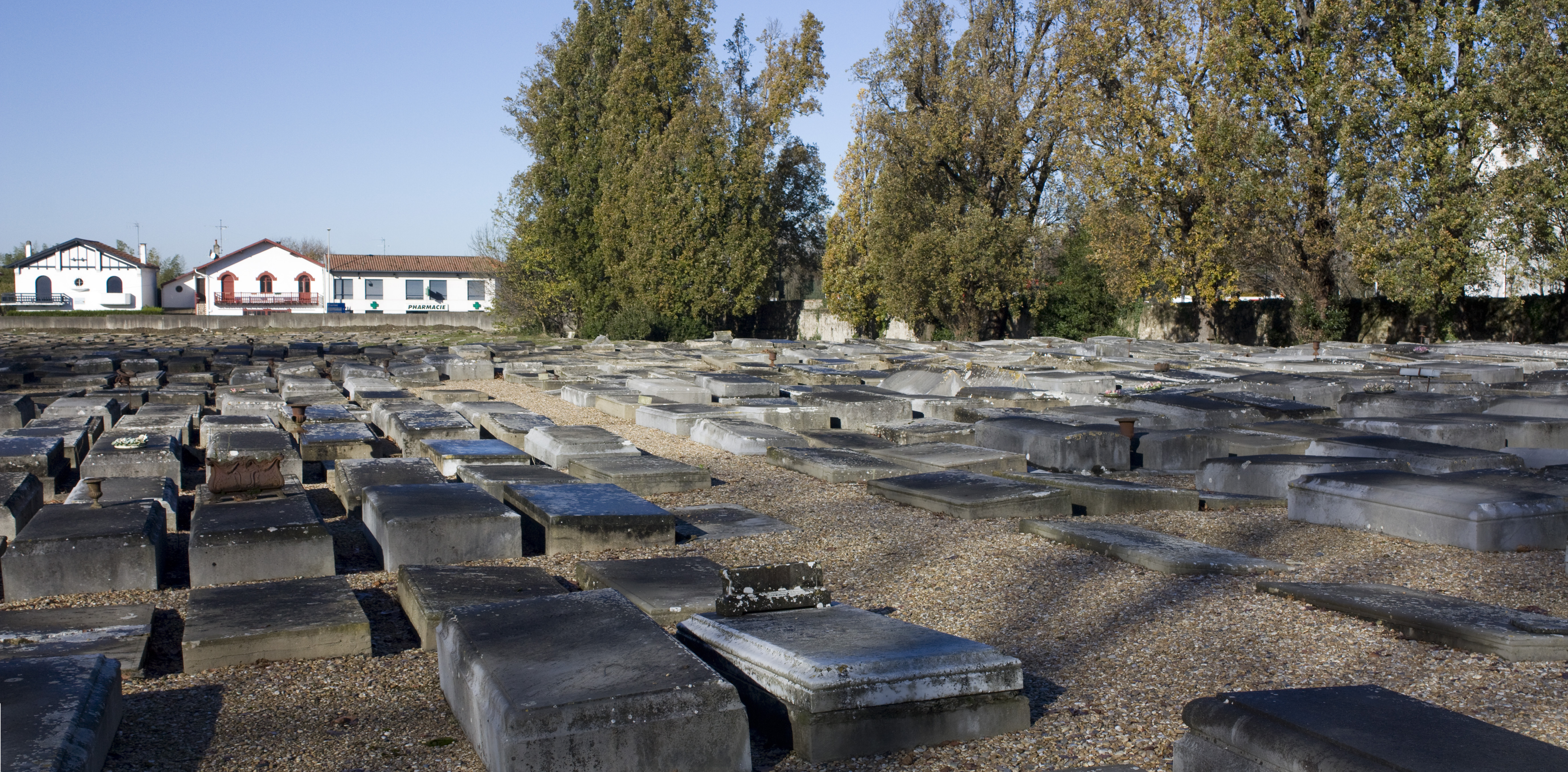
The 18th Century section
