= Jean Paul Leon =

French painter

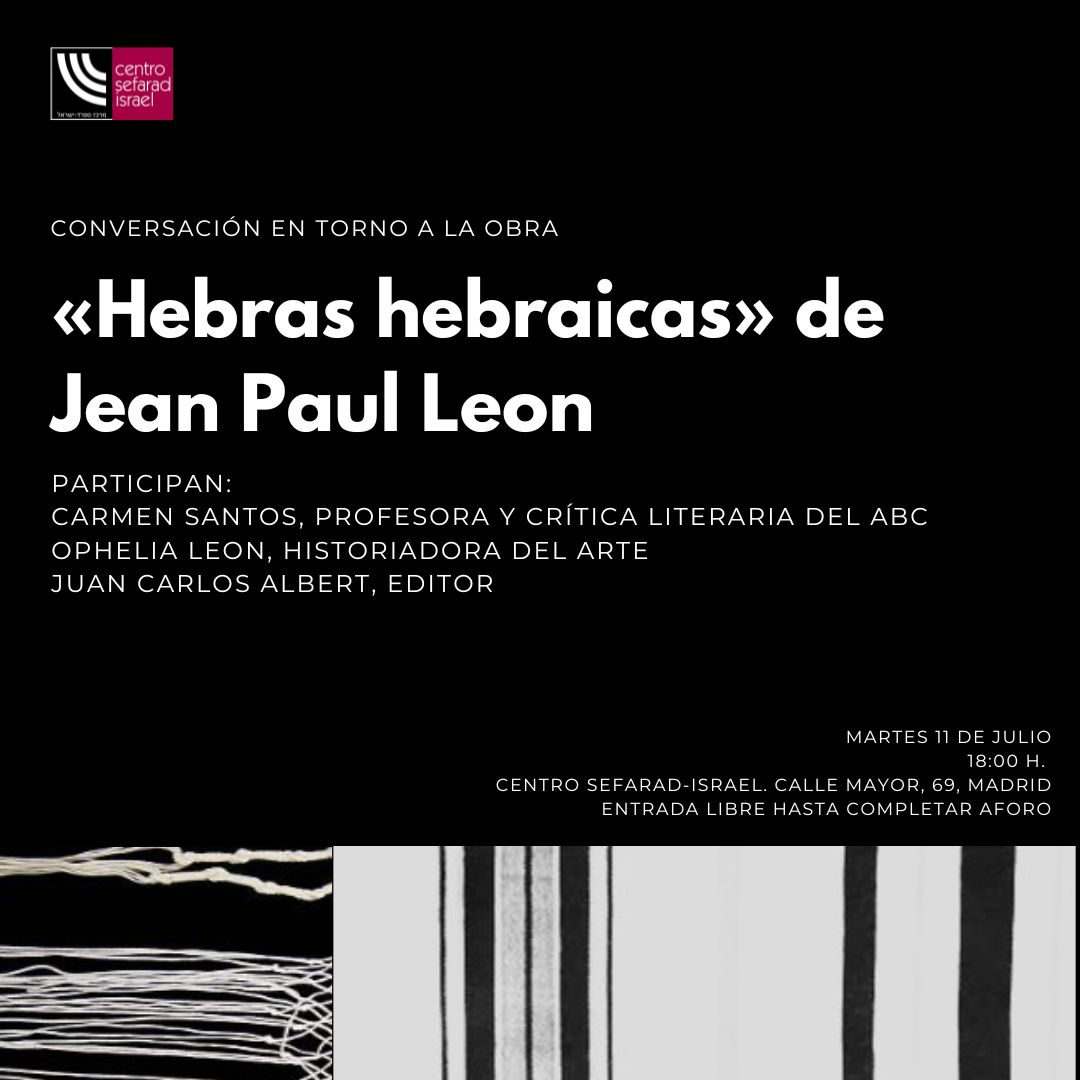

Jean Paul Leon (born 1955) is a French/Spanish artist, sculptor, writer, known mainly for his work Unison which assembles four art collections on the three Mediterranean Religions and Buddhism - Daoism, calling for understanding and dialogue among all people. His book Heritage, prefaced by French Minister Jack Lang and recommended by The Louvre Museum curator Lizzie Boubli is the first of the trilogy. This was followed by the publication of his book of short stories and paintings of the Menorah, Hebras hebraicas, launched at Museo Centro Sefarad-Israel in Madrid and featured on Radio Sefarad Interview Hebras hebraicas Jean Paul Leon.

In 2020, Universo de Letras, Editorial Planeta, published Mujeres en la Cruz. Under the same title, his collection of paintings Women on the Cross, exhibited at Fundación Antonio Berni, inspired the workshops and the participatory digital museum Art4WomensRights.com supported by ICOM, the International Council of Museums, Nigeria, to raise consciousness through Art on human trafficking, sex violations and other issues affecting women today in the country and worldwide.

His latest book, La palabra desnuda, (The Naked Word), was presented at the Ateneo de Madrid November 30, 2023 along with the Book of Aphorisms, Año bisiesto

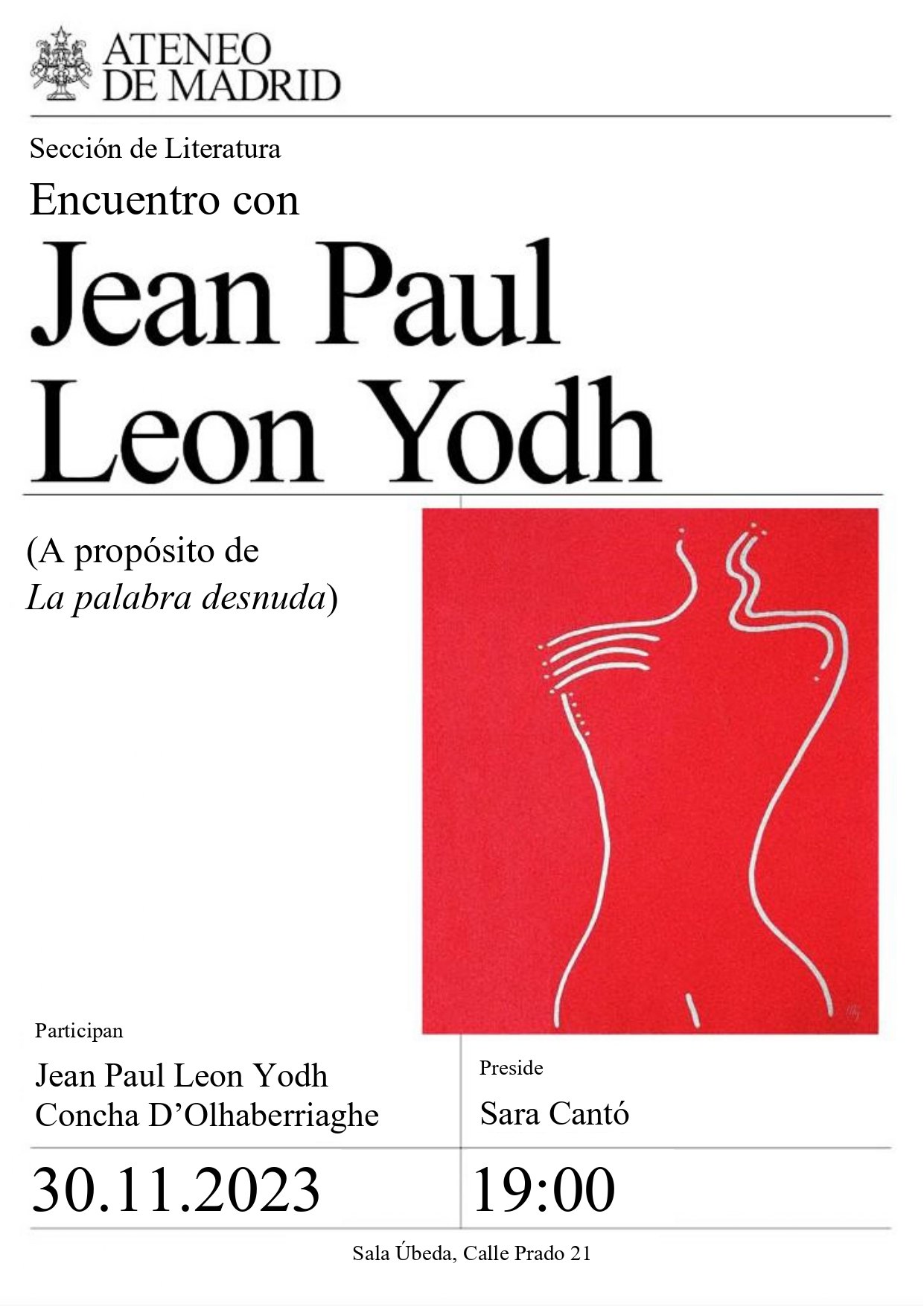

Jean Paul Leon Yodh's 4m long public mural, Da Vinci's Dream or the Nightmare of the 4 Judges, was inaugurated at the Central Hallway of the Hospital Clínic de Barcelona on February 8, 2024, two years exactly from the date of the kidney transplant donated by his wife. The event was covered live on TV3 Interview Mural Jean Paul Leon Yodh.

The Menorot as an ensemble. Paris premiere at Le Marais 2005

== Early years ==
Jean Paul Leon was raised in France and Spain and educated in England in the Classics, Greek, and Latin. At age 7 and a half, Leon met Pablo Ruíz Picasso, a comrade of his grandfather. Meeting the man and visiting his studio had a major and lasting impact on his life. At age 11, Leon won a nationwide writing contest sponsored by Coca-Cola.

== As a Writer ==
By 16, Jean Paul Leon had published his first article for the newspaper El Norte de Castilla, under the auspices of laureate Miguel Delibes, where years later, he became a columnist. At 19, he began writing as a freelancer for the magazine Triunfo, publishing in-depth interviews with English folk-singer-songwriters John Martyn, Sandy Denny, Nick Drake, and others. His short story, The Last Judgement, was published by Grafein, Barcelona in April 2015 for the benefit of Doctors Without Borders. At 18, he began a series of solo art exhibits curated by Chantal Hinaut through the Alliance Française.

Having spent 12 years as a writer in Hollywood, he has now picked up where he left off and started writing and publishing again in Spanish with four titles in the last four years.

In her introduction to La palabra desnuda at Ateneo de Madrid, Professor and literary critic, Concha D'Olhaberriague, describes Jean Paul Leon Yodh as "an avant garde writer, with the grace to combine verbal registers with efficiency, self-confidence, impudence and a cynical touch. Torrential enumerations sometimes render a frenetic rhythm to the fluid, rhythmic and fun style that sprouts spontaneously, evidencing his Jewish humor replete with satire, wit, a eschatological component and black humor."

== Career ==
By 23, Jean Paul Leon had married and moved to New York City, where, on the very first exhibit of his drawings, he was selected as 'most promising young artist' at New York's Washington Square Outdoor Art Exhibit.

At 24, he had his first one-man-show on Madison Avenue, N.Y.C., at Barbara Walter's Gallery. From there, he continued exhibiting until the 90's when he moved to Hollywood to work in the film and animation industry. In 2003, after 12 years in Los Angeles, he returned to Paris, where he began exhibiting again and continued working on a lifelong choice of subject: Light and Luminaries, their contribution to universal culture.

In 2006, Jean Paul Leon's oeuvre, encompassing 30 years of work on the Menorah as conducting wire and symbol of light was assembled in the art book Héritage, prefaced by French Minister of Culture Jack Lang and recommended by The Louvre Museum curator Lizzie Boubli. The book Heritage, which unites the artist's paintings and his writings, in three languages, was edited by Michael Neugebauer, published by MinEdition France and sponsored by the Culture Mission of La Fondation pour la Mémoire de la Shoah, Paris. while presided by French Minister Simone Veil, survivor of Bergen-Belsen and first woman President of the European Parliament. Richard Covington, writer for the Smithsonian, New York Times and International Herald Tribune described the work saying: "There's an incandescent energy here that rewards every viewing with unexpected revelations, keeping the eye and brain off-balance and alive".

In 2005-2006, an exhibit of the Heritage Collection was presented by the Jewish Museum of Belgium at the Cathedral of Brussels under the title “Menorah in the Cathedral”, by invitation of Cardinal Godfried Danneels, and dealt with the pain and disagreement between the two communities Christian and Jewish. The exhibit resulted in a historic encounter between the two communities and as thus was reported in the Flemish Journal De Standaard. The exhibit was inaugurated by the then Archbishop of Brussels, Jozef De Kesel. Addressing Baron Georges Schnek, the then President of the Consistory and of the Jewish Museum, the public, and Prof. Albert Guigui, Grand Rabbi of the Great Synagogue of Brussels, Monsignor De Kessel offered his apologies for the crimes perpetrated against the Jews on May 1370 and commemorated in the windows of the Cathedral of Brussels, along with many others throughout Belgium, denominated as ‘The Massacre of Brussels’. This event marked the first steps in the compilation of the artist’s oeuvre later assembled under The Unison Collection.

During this period, while museum, gallery exhibits and public conferences succeeded one another, Jean Paul Leon started work on a new collection: I.N.R.I. Ieusus Nazarenus Rex Iudeurum (oil on wood panels over large crosses) 33 incisive portraits that depict the figure of Jesus Christ and its varying socio/psychological aspects as His myth travelled through the last 2000 years as explained by Clare McAndrews of Arts Economics in her article, Jean Paul Leon: Portrait of an Artist. In the prologue to the book I.N.R.I. by Jean Paul León, notable British writer Philip Pullman, author of The Dark Materials & The good man Jesus and the scoundrel Christ, observes: ″These pictures represent a formidable attempt to grapple with the legacy of the most strange and enigmatic man who ever lived.″

In 2007, Jean Paul Leon moved his studio to Dublin, starting with an invitation by publisher and founder Noelle Campbell-Sharp for a residency as an artist at the Cill Rialaig Arts Centre, where he created Ulysses, Fate and Destiny, an art collection illustrating the 18 chapters of James Joyce's Ulysses (novel), exploring the subject of Leopold Bloom as the figure of the ever wandering Jew, and Homer's Odysseus as the ultimate hero facing the peril of death at every turn of his journey back home to his kingdom, to his Ithaca.

After completing Ulysses, Fate & Destiny in Dublin, Jean Paul Leon settled in Berlin, focusing his energy on a pending collection, Reflections of Islam, started in 1978 when, during his honeymoon in the Sahara, he was given a copy of the Qur'an by a fellow traveller. The work was taken up again in 1991, during the invasion of Kuwait, in another desert, the Sonoran Desert, Arizona, where the bulk of the work was created with 3D objects and mirrors that reflect the viewer and incorporate him/her into the artwork, projecting exterior images and interior reflections. The resulting body of work is based on the readings of the text, on contemplation, on the mirror of the desert, on the oasis, on the sand, on the wind, on his love for calligraphy, on the spell of La Alhambra & its unique tendency to travel with him, not only in the arabesque & the filigree of time but on the most ogival confines of the imagination.

The three collections: Hebrew Heritage, I.N.R.I. & Reflections of Islam, along with Oriental Meditations conform the Unison Collection.

The Unison Collection is the result of Jean Paul Leon Yodh's lifelong dedication and his ultimate conviction... considering that "when a seeker enters through the threshold of the three monotheistic religions, he secretly expects Maggid – to hear the voice of God – but inevitably stumbles upon the restricted realm of mankind". Ong Namo Guru Dev Namo. In his introduction to the artist, leading Art Appraiser of the City of Paris, Maître Pierre Cornette de St-Cyr, writes: "the light in art, as Jean Paul Leon shows us, will lead us towards intelligence."
