= Gabriel Astruc =

French journalist and theatre manager (1864–1938)

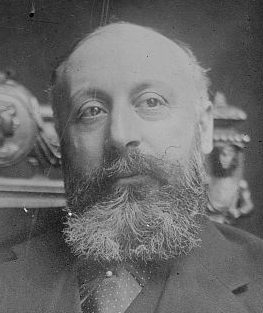
- Gabriel Astruc
- Born: 14 March 1864; Bordeaux, France
- Died: 7 July 1938 (aged 74); Paris, France
- Occupations: Journalist, agent, promoter, theatre manager, theatrical impresario, playwright

Gabriel Astruc (14 March 1864 – 7 July 1938) was a French journalist, agent, promoter, theatre manager, theatrical impresario, and playwright whose career connects many of the best-known incidents and personalities of Belle Epoque Paris. He was the uncle of sculptor, Louise Ochsé (Mayer).

== Biography ==
Born in Bordeaux, to the Astruc family, he was the son of Élie Aristide Astruc (1831–1905), the Grand Rabbi of Belgium from 1866 to 1879, and began his career working for publisher Paul Ollendorff, and as a columnist from 1885 through 1895. As a regular at Montmartre's prototypically bohemian Le Chat Noir cabaret, he befriended a young Erik Satie and wrote articles and theater pieces under the pen name Surtac. In 1897 he founded a music publishing company with his father-in-law Wilhelm Enoch, by 1900 he had introduced the luxury magazine Musica, and by 1904 had become a concert promoter.

In this period he was the booking agent for Mata Hari. Astruc booked Hari into the Paris Olympia in August 1905, and would manage her appearances for the next ten years, through the height of her considerable fame. He also served as booking agent for Feodor Chaliapin, Arthur Rubinstein, and Wanda Landowska, but not Isadora Duncan, whom he considered too subtle to attract a sizable audience.

From 1905 through 1912 Astruc brought a long list of musical giants to Paris under the banner "Great Season of Paris", including an Italian season with Enrico Caruso and Australian soprano Nellie Melba in 1905, the creation of Salome under the baton of Richard Strauss in 1907, the Ballets Russes of Diaghilev in 1909, the Metropolitan Opera conducted by Arturo Toscanini in 1910, and Debussy's Le martyre de Saint Sébastien (text by Gabriele D'Annunzio) in 1911.

In 1913 Astruc tried to parlay his success by commissioning Auguste Perret to build the innovative Théâtre des Champs-Élysées in the Avenue Montaige. This building is an architectural landmark of early reinforced concrete. After a brilliant and scandalous first season, climaxed by the famous riot at the May 29 premiere of The Rite of Spring, Astruc found himself financially ruined within six months. He was also the target of anti-Semitic attacks from Léon Daudet and others of the Action Française.

After World War I, he worked in the field of radio and advertising, and in 1929 served as the manager of the Théâtre Pigalle for Philippe de Rothschild. Astruc and Marcel Proust were friends, having helped proofread the first edition of Swann's Way, and Proust returned the favor by helping Astruc prepare his memoirs, Le pavillon des fantômes, appearing in 1929.

His papers reside at the New York Public Library for the Performing Arts Dance Collection.

== Sources ==
- this page translated from its equivalent on French Wikipedia accessed 2010-09-22
