= Astruc family =

Sephardic Jewish family from Avignon, France

Astruc family משפחת אסטרוק
- Country: Kingdom of France
- Etymology: Astruc was a common name amongst Jews in France, Astruc meaning "happy" in Catalan.
- Origin: Avignon, France
- Founded: 1660; 366 years ago
- Founder: Israel bar Joshua Astruc
- Members: Israel bar Joshua Astruc Jean Astruc Élie-Aristide Astruc Gabriel Astruc
- Traditions: Jewish (Sefard)

The Astruc family are a Sephardic Jewish family from Avignon, France. The family has produced several Rabbis, physicians, journalists, and Talmudists who have been prominent throughout France. The founder of the modern family is Israel bar Joshua Astruc who in 1666 moved his family to Bordeaux, France, where they reside today.

== Members ==
1. Israel bar Joshua Astruc – French Rabbi.
2. Jean Astruc – French professor of Medicine, those family converted to Catholicism.
3. Élie-Aristide Astruc – Grand Rabbi of Belgium.
4. Gabriel Astruc – French journalist.
5. Alexandre Astruc - French film critic.
6. Miriam Astruc – French archaeologist .
