= History of the Jews in Belgium =

Belgian Jews Belgische Joden/Juifs belges יהודים בלגיים/בעלגיאַן אידן
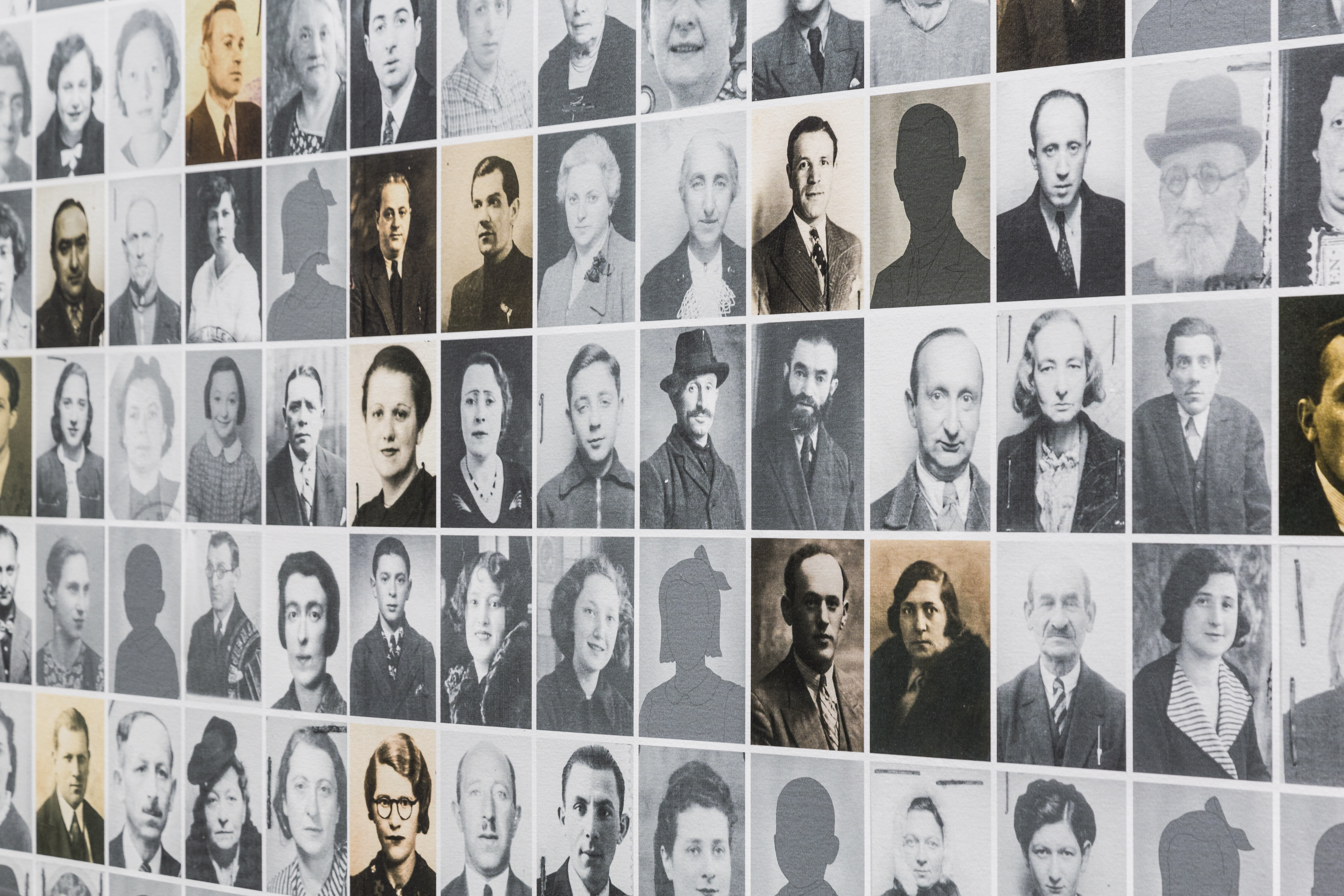
- Pictures of Belgian Jews deported from the Dossin Barracks during the Holocaust

Total population
- 30,000-42,000

Regions with significant populations
- Antwerp, Brussels

Languages
- Dutch, French, Hebrew, Yiddish or other languages

Religion
- Judaism and Irreligious

Related ethnic groups
- Ashkenazi Jews, Sephardi Jews

The location of Belgium (dark green) in Europe

The history of the Jews in Belgium goes back to the 1st century CE until today. The Jewish community numbered 66,000 on the eve of the Second World War but after the war and the Holocaust, now is less than half that number.

Today, Belgium is home to more than 29,000 Jews, of whom two-thirds live in Antwerp.

== History ==
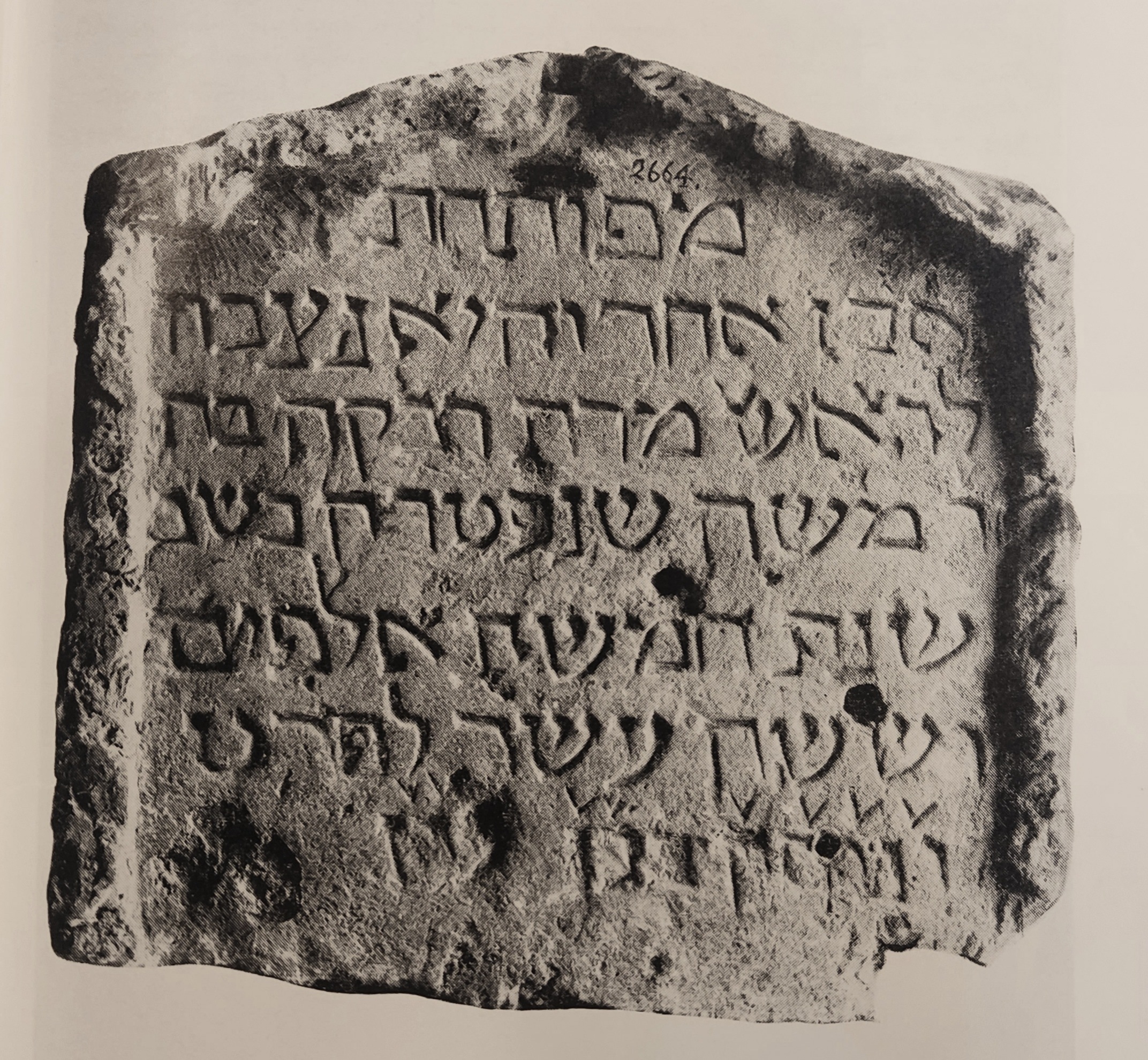
Tombstone from Tienen dating from 1255-56, with the Hebrew inscription: "A stone engraved and placed at the head of (the) lady Rivkah, daughter of Mr. Moses, who died in the year 5016 and who rests in the garden of Eden".

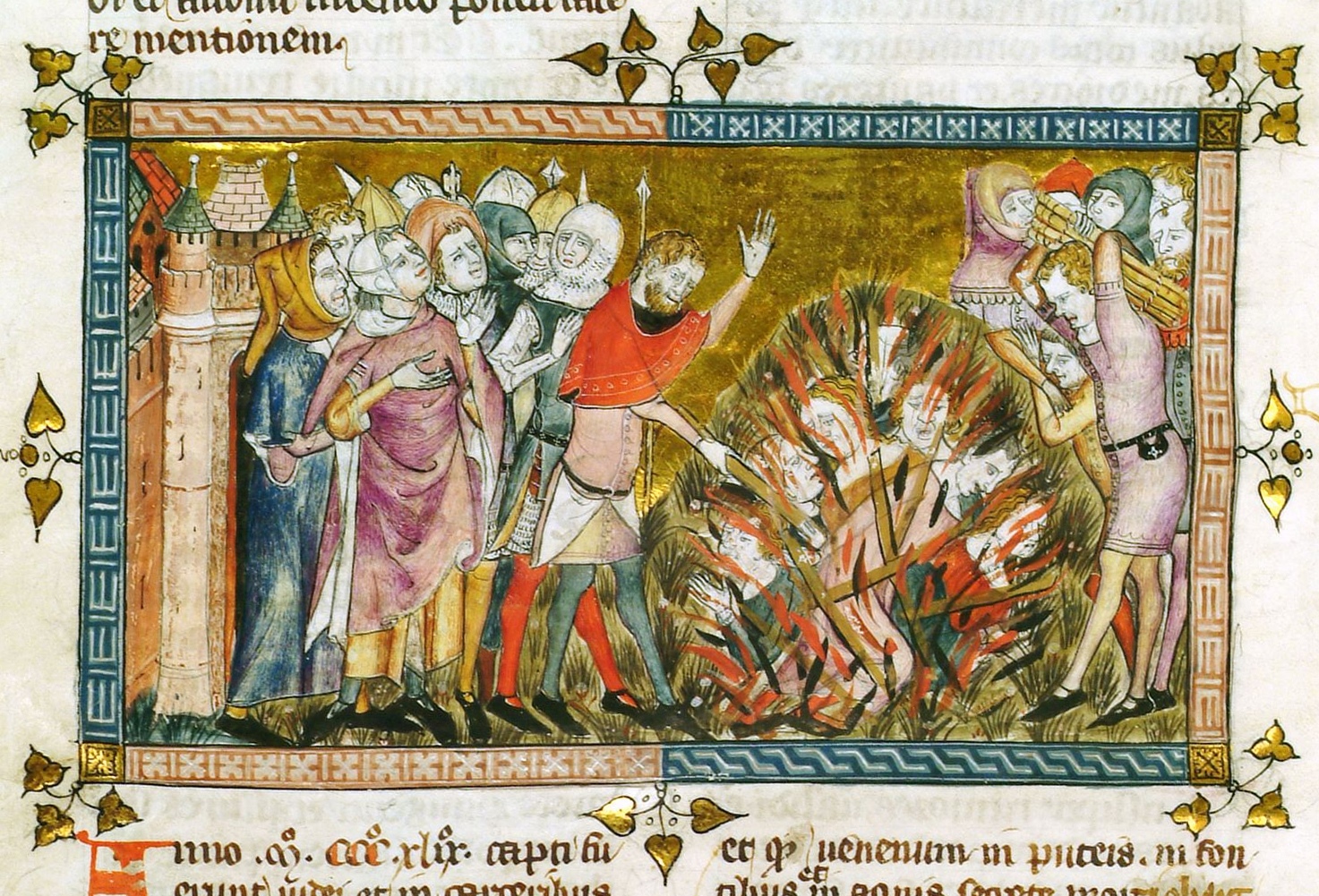
Jews being burned at the stake in 1349. Miniature from a 14th-century manuscript Antiquitates Flandriae by Gilles Li Muisis.

=== Early history ===
Jews were mentioned in the Middle Ages in Brabant, and in 1261 Duke Henry III ordered the expulsion of Jews and usurers from the province. The Jewish community suffered further during the Crusades, as many Jews who refused to be baptised were put to death. This early community mostly disappeared after the Black Death persecutions 1348–1350, and finally the Brussels massacre, 1370.

=== Sephardim ===
In the 16th century, many Sephardic Jews who had been expelled from Spain and Portugal settled in Belgium and the Netherlands. In addition, many Marranos (crypto-Jews who outwardly professed Christianity) settled in Antwerp at the end of the 15th century.

=== Later history ===
Austrian (Habsburg) rule in Belgium started in 1713. Particularly under Emperor Joseph II, Jews acquired more rights, such as those to practice crafts, own land, and operate their own cemeteries. A number of Ashkenazi Jews immigrated to the area in that period. The status of Jews in Belgium improved further under French and Dutch rule.

Shortly following Belgian independence, in 1831, Judaism was recognized as an official religion (besides Roman Catholicism, the country's majority faith, and Protestantism). On 17 March 1832 the Central Jewish Consistory of Belgium was founded as the official representative of the Jewish religion to the Belgian authorities. The Great Synagogue of Brussels was built in 1876–1877.

Around the turn of the century, the focal point of the world's diamond trade shifted from Amsterdam to Antwerp, bringing many Jewish diamond traders and polishers to the city. During World War I, many fled to the neutral Netherlands, but they returned after the war. Many Polish and Romanian Jews immigrated during the 1920s while Nazi persecutions brought waves of German and Austrian Jews in the 1930s.

=== Holocaust ===
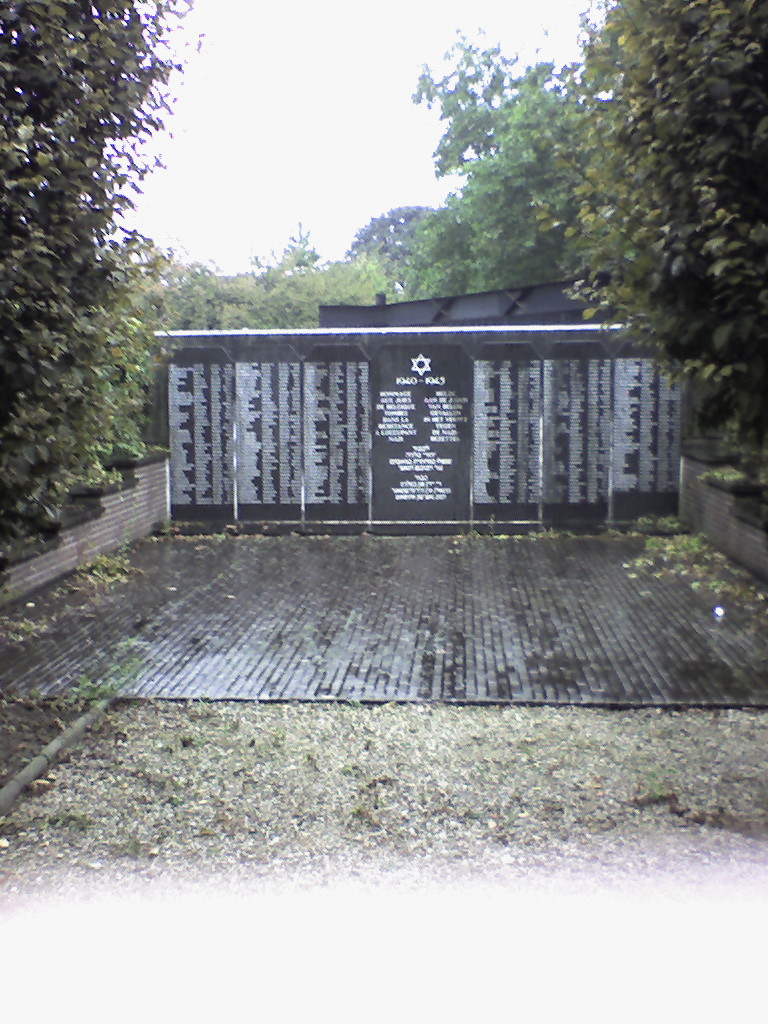
National Memorial to the Jewish Martyrs of Belgium, in Anderlecht (Brussels)

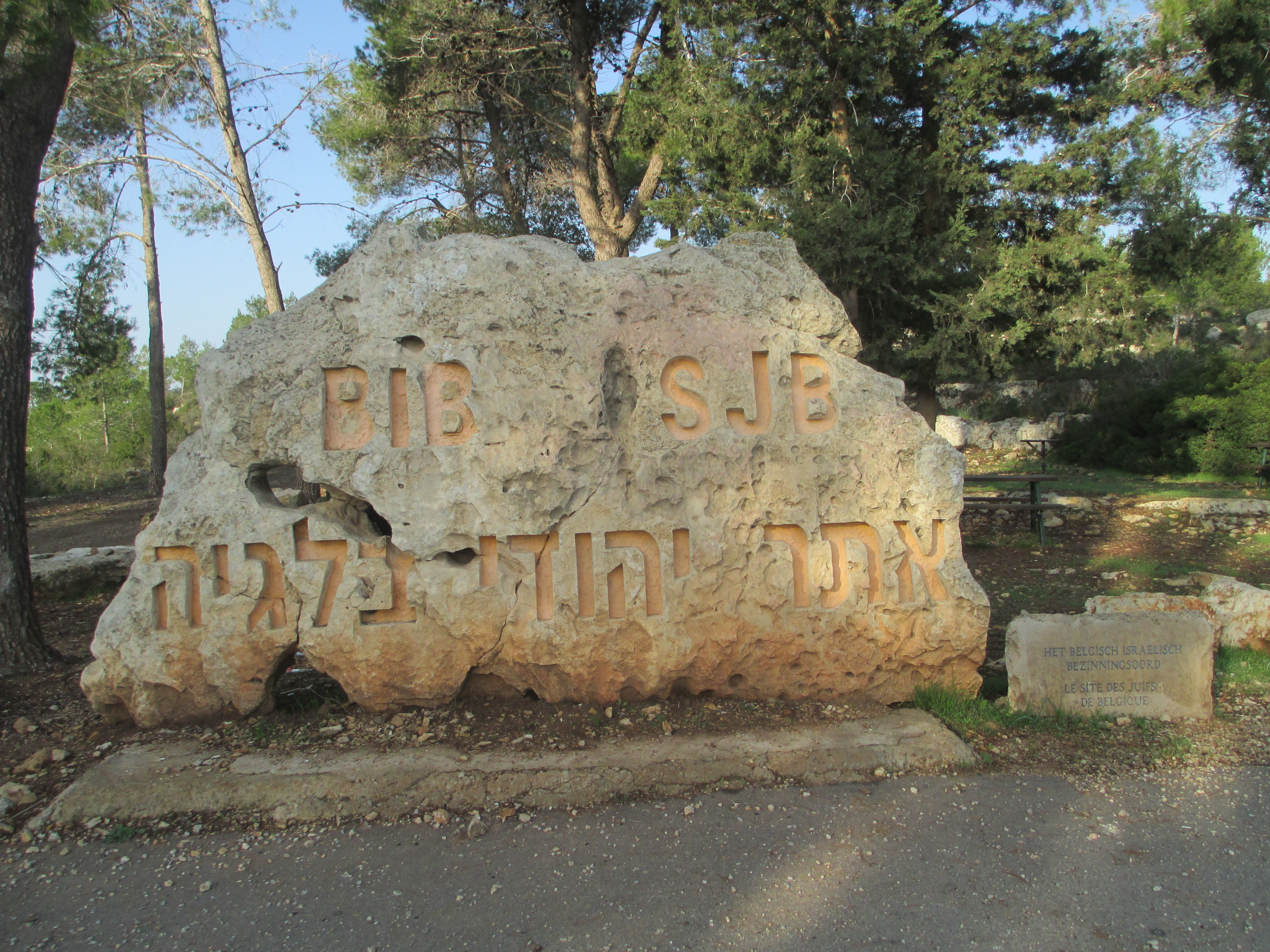
Memorial to Belgian Jews in Neve Ilan Forest, Israel

Prior to the Second World War, and its peak, the Jewish community of Belgium consisted of roughly 70,000 Jews (35,000 resided in Antwerp and 25,000 in Brussels). About 22,000 Jews at that time were German Jewish refugees. Only 6% of the Jewish population were of Belgian nationality. Belgium was occupied by Nazi Germany between May 1940 and September 1944, and antisemitic policies were adopted throughout Belgium, even though popular resistance in some cities hindered their full application. Belgian local police rounded up Jews, on three occasions in Antwerp, assisting the German in fulfilling their murderous policy towards the Jews. Approximately 45% of the Belgian Jews (25.484 people) were deported to concentration camps from Dossin Barracks in Mechelen, primarily to Auschwitz. Only 1,200 of the deportees survived the war. The Committee for Jewish Defence, which worked with the national resistance movement Front de l'Indépendance, was the largest Jewish defence movement in Belgium during the war. Some Belgian Jews who fled Belgium in 1940 were deported on transports from Drancy, France. A total of 28,900 Belgian Jews perished between 1942 and 1945. Belgium was the only occupied country in which a transport (Train XX) was halted to give deportees a chance to escape.

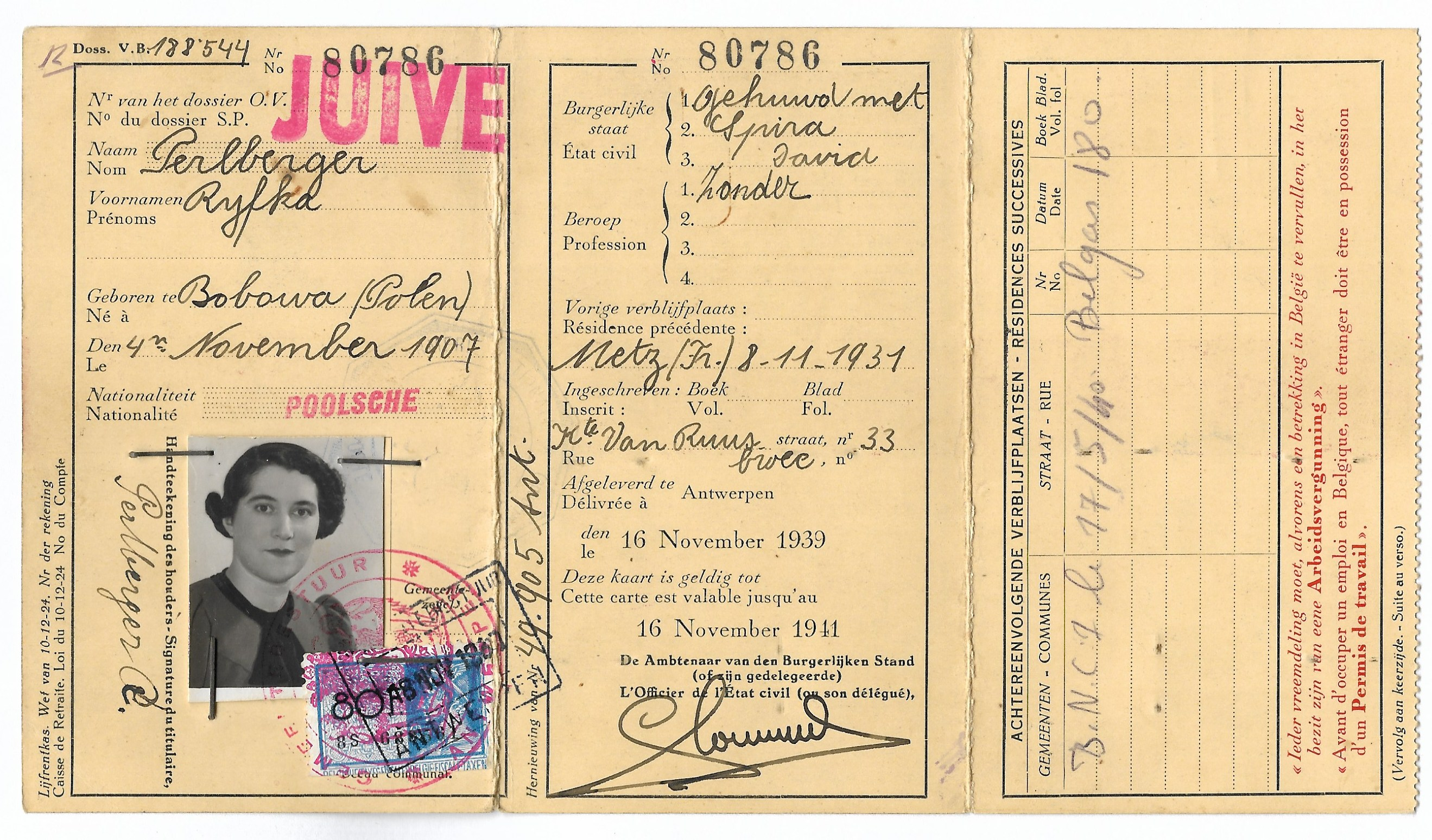
Belgian ID card for a foreign Jewish woman used in Vichy France

The National Memorial to the Jewish Martyrs of Belgium is in Brussels. More than twenty thousand names of Belgian Jewish victims are inscribed on the walls of the Monument, some of whom were killed on Belgian territory, but many of whom were shipped off to the death camps and executed in the East.

== Today ==
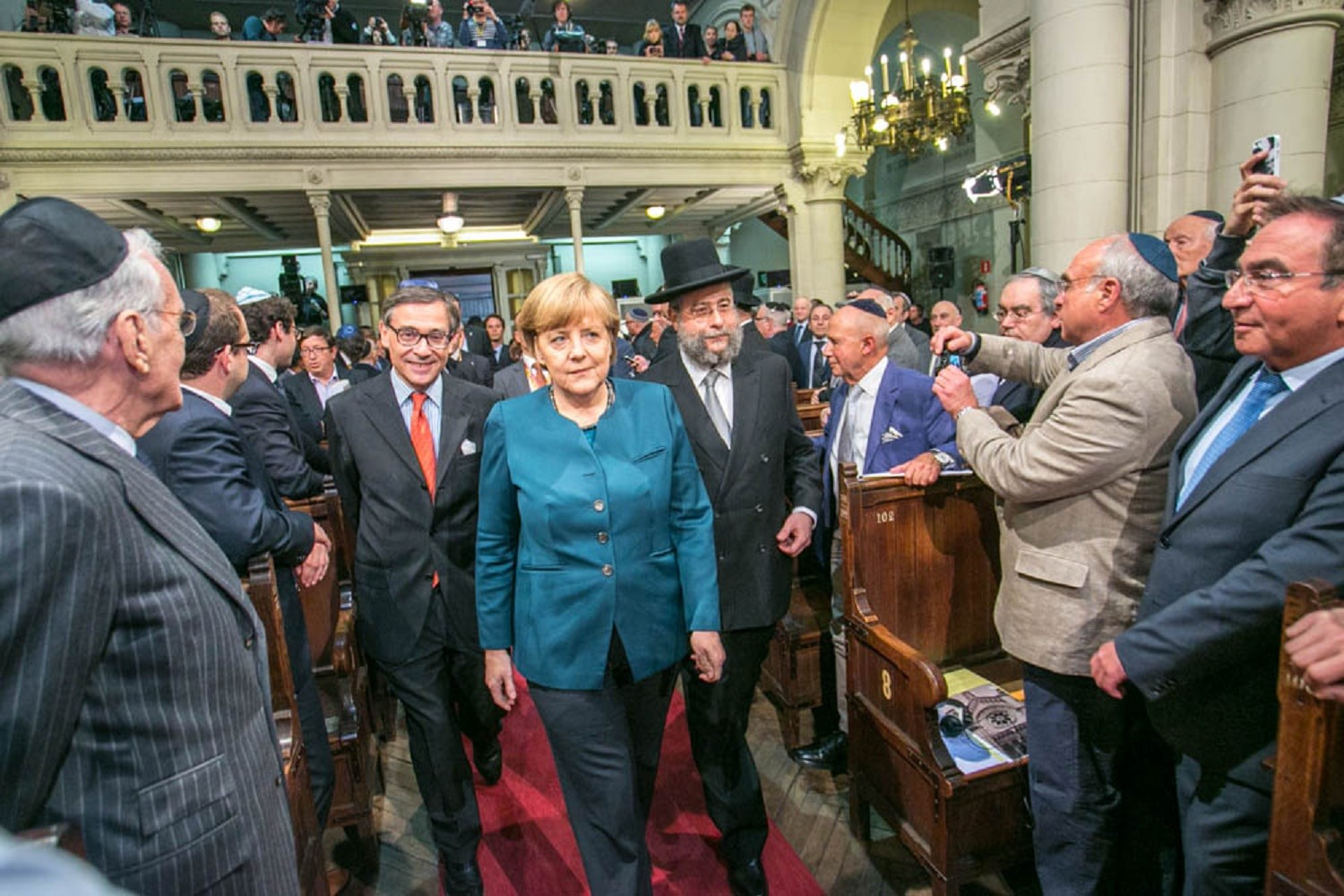
Angela Merkel and Moscow Chief Rabbi Pinchas Goldschmidt in the Great Synagogue of Brussels, 2016

Today, there are around 29,000 Jews in Belgium. The Jewish Community of Antwerp (about 20,000 people) is one of the largest single communities in Europe, and one of the last places in the world where Yiddish is its primary language (mirroring certain Orthodox and Hassidic communities in New York, London and Israel). In addition a very high percentage (95%) of Jewish children in Antwerp receive a Jewish education. In contemporary Belgium, five Jewish newspapers and more than 45 active synagogues exist, 30 of which are in Antwerp.

=== Antisemitic incidents ===
According to JTA report, the number of antisemitic incidents in 2012 was the highest since 2009. 80 antisemitic incidents were reported throughout Belgium in 2012, a 23% increase from 2011 and an overall increase of 34% since 2000. Five of the incidents involved physical attacks, three of which occurred in Antwerp.

In October 2013, Isi Leibler, the former president of the Executive Council of Australian Jewry, reported on the alarming increase in the levels of antisemitism in Belgium. Leibler described a wide use of antisemitic caricatures in the media including a caricature on the official central Flanders educational website, comparing Israel to Nazi Germany. In addition, he described an increase of 30% in the number of antisemitic incidents including physical assaults and vandalism of Jewish institutions. Furthermore, according to a survey conducted among eight Jewish communities in eight European Union countries, 88% of Belgian Jews feel that in the course of recent years, antisemitism has intensified in their country. 10% of the Belgian survey respondents reported suffering from incidents of physical violence or threats due to their Jewish affiliation since 2008. Most of the victims did not report the incidents to the police.

The increased frequency of antisemitic attacks started in May 2014, when a Franco-Algerian from Roubaix killed four people in a shooting at the Belgian Jewish Museum in Brussels. Two days later, a young Muslim man entered the CCU (Jewish Cultural Center) while an event was taking place and shouted racist slurs. A month later, a school bus in Antwerp, that was driving 5-year-old Jewish children was stoned by a group of Muslim teens. Towards the end of August 2014, a 75-year-old Jewish woman was hit and pushed to the ground because of her Jewish-sounding surname. The Coordination Forum for Countering Antisemitism reported six racist incidents, three of which tool place as a part of different demonstrations against Operation Protective Edge in Gaza (July–August 2014). Those demonstrations included antisemitic slurs such as "slaughter the Jews" and "Death to the Jews."

=== Aalst annual carnival ===
In 2009, UNESCO added the annual Carnival of Aalst to its extended Intangible Cultural Heritage List. In March 2019, a float showcasing Jewish stereotypes was displayed at the carnival. The float was widely condemned by major European Jewish groups and Belgium's Jewish community. In a report to UNESCO following a complaint by the Forum der Joodse Organisaties, Unia, the country's watchdog on racism, said the float was of a clearly antisemitic kind, but that no laws were breached.

After the city's mayor refused to ban a repeat of such displays, he asked UNESCO through a statement to regional TV Oost to strip the Aalst carnival of World Heritage status, which UNESCO did in December 2019, "over recurring repetition of racist and antisemitic representations".

=== Data and analysis ===
A review study published in 2015 by the Institute for the Study of Global Antisemitism and Policy (ISGAP) revealed that in a survey conducted in Brussels, more than half of the Muslim origin respondents agreed with antisemitic statements, such as: "Jews want to dominate everything" and "Jews incite to war and blame others". The review, which analysed a few studies regarding antisemitism in Europe, found that the level of antisemitic attitudes is significantly higher among Muslims than among non-Muslims.

An ADL (Anti-Defamation League) audit published in June 2015 revealed an increase in level of concern about violence against Jews in Belgium. In addition, 7% of the participants claimed that the number of Jews murdered in the Holocaust has been greatly exaggerated by history. In a follow-up survey 53% of the respondents agreed with the statement: "Violence against Jews is a symptom of deep anti-Jewish feelings among some people in my country". The ADL also conducted a research of anti-Jewish attitudes inside the Muslim population of Belgium. The results showed that 82% of Muslim Belgium agreed with the state "Jews have too much power in the business world", compared to 36% of the national population who agreed with it. In all eleven categories included in the research, the Muslim population reached higher levels of agreement with anti-Jewish stereotypes.

On 2015 the Fundamental Rights Agency published its annual overview of data on antisemitism available in the European Union. The finding of the file presents a persistent increase in the number of antisemitic incidents in Belgium through the last ten years. Data of the Interfederal Centre for Equal Opportunities displayed in the file, shows that 130 Complaints of antisemitism were received during 2014, compared to 85 complaints in 2013. Furthermore, the number of incidents in each category has increased in 2014, compared with 2013.

The ADL (Anti-Defamation League) published on 2016 an update for their "ADL Global 100", that contained an update of the antisemitic attitudes toward Jews in Belgium. The findings showed a decrease in the percentage of the population harboring antisemitic attitudes (21% in 2015, compare to 27% in 2014). In addition, the survey shows that 46% of the respondents agree with the phrase "Jews are more loyal to Israel than to this country", and that 39% of the respondents agree with the phrase "Jews still talk too much about what happened to them in the Holocaust".

== Notable people ==
- Pierre Alechinsky, artist
- Louis Cahen d'Anvers, banker
- Menachem Banitt, scholar
- Ellie Blanche Delvaux (Blanche), singer
- Virginie Efira, actress
- François Englert, theoretical physicist, Nobel Prize laureate
- Leopold Flam, philosopher
- Louis Frank, lawyer
- Michael Freilich, politician
- Paul Hymans, politician, second president of the League of Nations
- Werner Lambersy, poet
- Bettina Le Beau, actress
- Alfred Loewenstein, financier
- Mischaël Modrikamen, politician and lawyer
- Nat Neujean, sculptor
- Frank Oz, actor
- Chaïm Perelman, philosopher
- Ilya Prigogine, physical chemist
- Andrée Rosenfeld, archaeologist
- Léon Rosenfeld, physicist and Marxist
- Amélie Rosseneu, judoka
- Gaston Salmon, fencer, Olympic champion
- Adolphe Samuel, music critic
- Jean-Claude Van Damme, actor
- Virgile Vandeput, alpine skier
- Eriek Verpale, writer
- Éliane Vogel-Polsky, lawyer and feminist
- Sophie Wilmès, politician, Prime Minister of Belgium
- Jonathan Zaccaï, actor

== See also ==
- Chaim Kreiswirth, the former Chief Rabbi of Antwerp
- Eisenman Synagogue
- History of the Jews in Antwerp
- Belgium–Israel relations
- History of the Jews in France
- History of the Jews in Germany
- History of the Jews in Luxembourg
- History of the Jews in the Netherlands
