= Great Synagogue of Europe =

Synagogue in Brussels, Belgium

- Grande synagogue d'Europe (French); Grote Synagoge van Europa (Dutch)
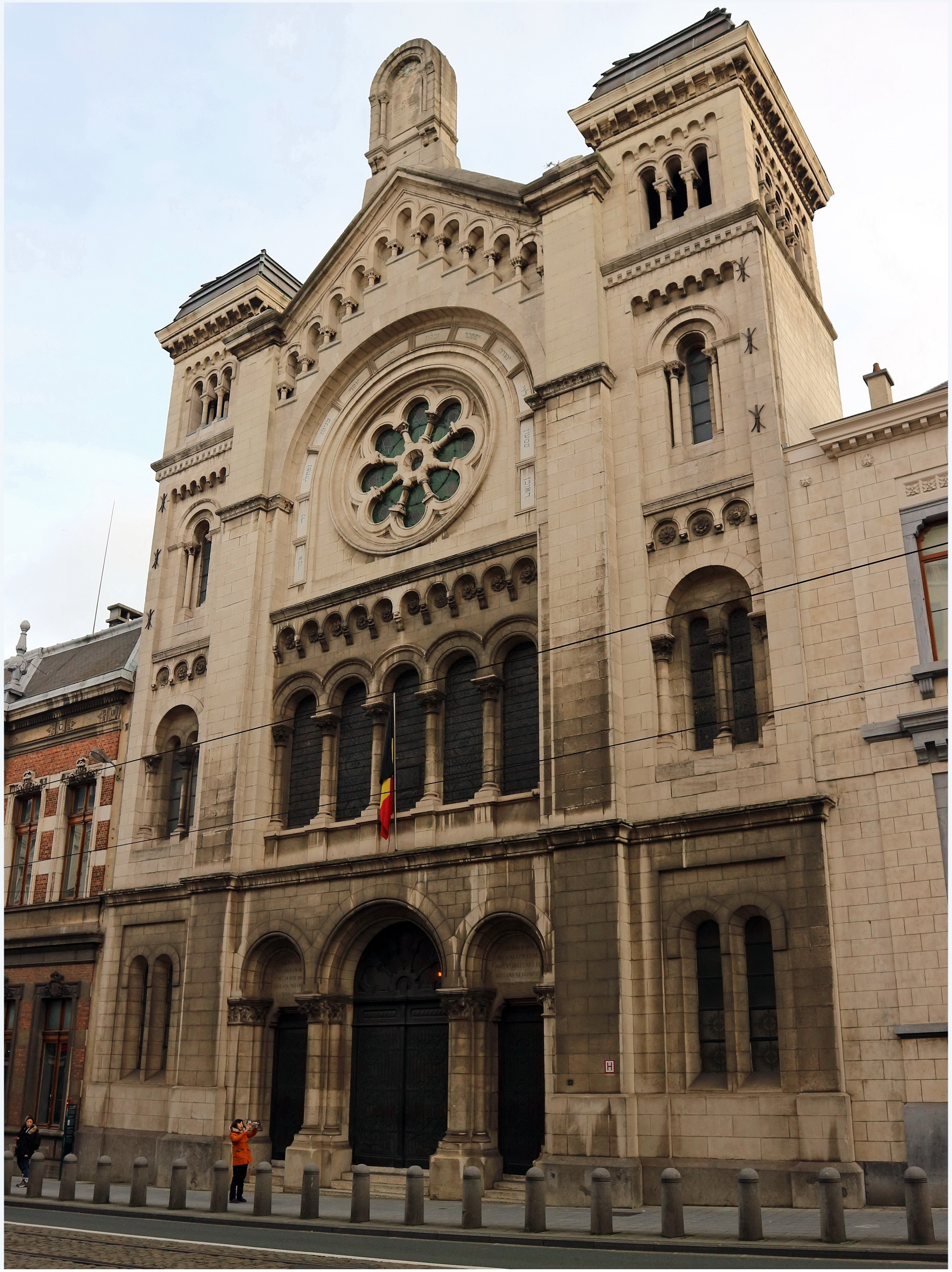

- Location of the synagogue in Brussels

Religion
- Affiliation: Judaism
- District: Sablon/Zavel
- Ecclesiastical or organisational status: Synagogue
- Leadership: Albert Guigui
- Status: Active

Location
- Location: Rue de la Régence / Regentschapsstraat 32; 1000 City of Brussels, Brussels-Capital Region
- Country: Belgium
- Coordinates: 50°50′20″N 4°21′18″E

Architecture
- Architect: Désiré De Keyser
- Type: Synagogue architecture
- Style: Romanesque Revival
- Groundbreaking: 1875
- Completed: 1878

The Great Synagogue of Europe (French: Grande synagogue d'Europe; Dutch: Grote Synagoge van Europa), formerly known as the Great Synagogue of Brussels (French: Grande synagogue de Bruxelles; Dutch: Grote Synagoge van Brussel), is the main synagogue in Brussels, Belgium, which was dedicated as a focal point for European Jews in 2008.

The building was designed in 1875 in a Romanesque-Byzantine style by the architect Désiré De Keyser and constructed in 1878. The synagogue survived the Holocaust in which 25,000 Belgian Jews died. Its chief rabbi is Albert Guigui and there are approximately 15,000 persons of Jewish faith in the city (as of 2008). It is located at 32, rue de la Régence/Regentschapsstraat in the Sablon/Zavel district (south-eastern part of Brussels' city centre).

== History ==
=== Early history ===
Shortly following Belgian independence, in 1831, Judaism was recognised as an official religion (alongside Roman Catholicism, the country's majority faith, and Protestantism). Despite this recognition, the Jewish community in Brussels had no place of worship, so in 1833, it acquired a building called the Petite Boucherie ("Small butcher's shop") from the Society of Friends of Fine Arts, on what is now the Place de Dinant/Dinantplein (formerly the Place de Bavière/Beierenplein) in central Brussels, and converted it into a synagogue. This first synagogue was inaugurated a few months later by the first Chief Rabbi of Belgium, Eliakim Carmoly.

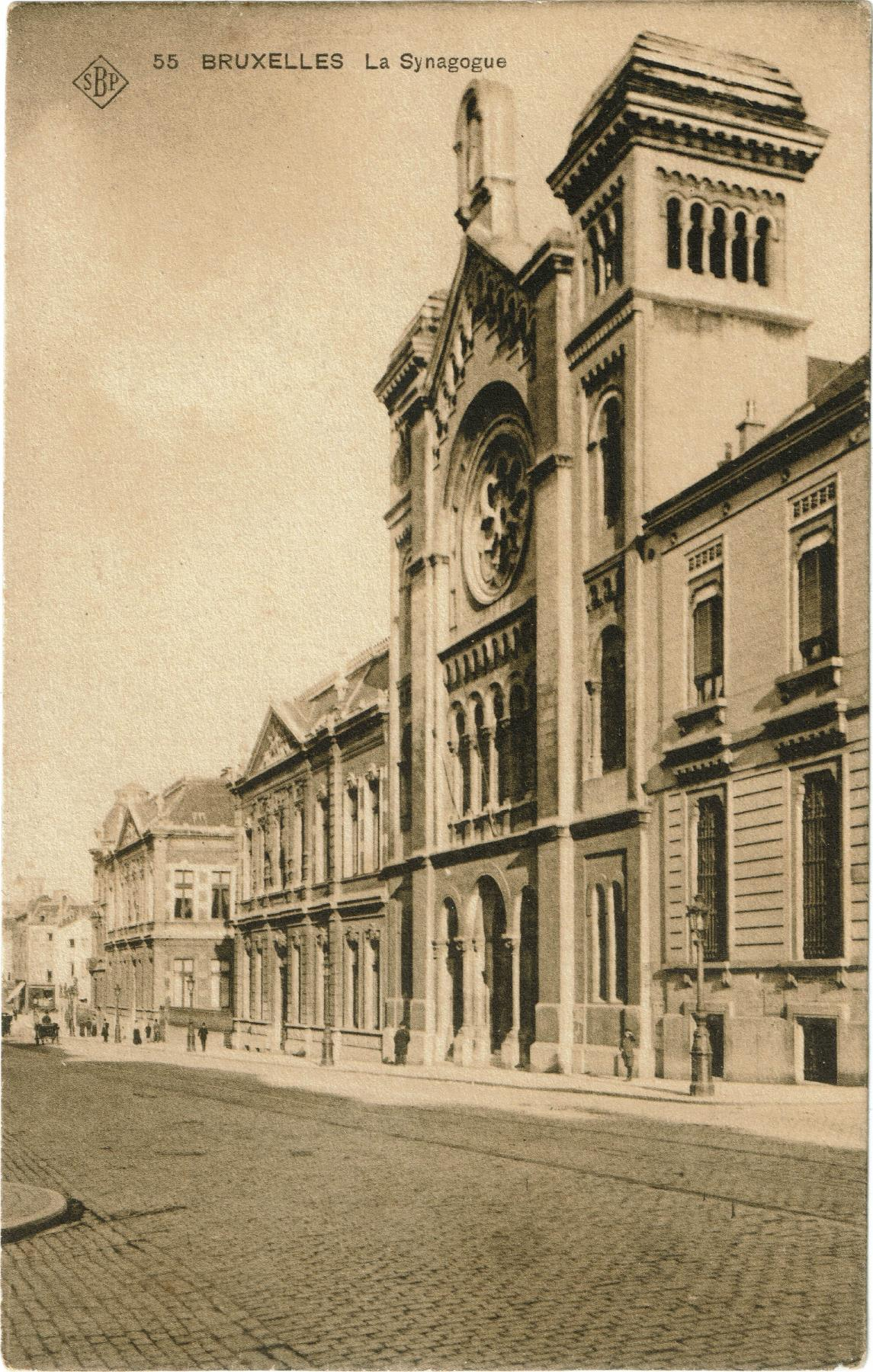
The Great Synagogue in the early 20th century

In 1875, the community had a larger synagogue built at its current address on the Rue de la Régence/Regentschapsstraat in the Sablon/Zavel district of Brussels. To avoid it being mistaken for a church, the architect Désiré De Keyser decided for a Romanesque-Byzantine style. The stained glass windows were made by Henri Dobbelaere from Bruges, the bronze chandeliers are by the Compagnie des Bronzes de Bruxelles, and the furniture and the place where the Tablets of the Law are kept are by the cabinetmaker L. Demeuter. The Great Synagogue of Brussels was inaugurated in 1878 by the Chief Rabbi Élie-Aristide Astruc.

=== 1982 terrorist attack ===
On Rosh Hashanah, 18 September 1982, the synagogue was attacked by a man with a submachine gun, seriously wounding four people. The attack has been attributed to the Abu Nidal Organization, a Palestinian militant group.

=== Dedication as "Great Synagogue of Europe" ===
On 4 June 2008, the synagogue was dedicated as the "Great Synagogue of Europe" by then-President of the European Commission, José Manuel Barroso, who signed a dedication document alongside two chief rabbis, with his name later inscribed on a plaque inside the building. It was envisioned to become a "symbolic focal point for Judaism in Europe", comparable to St. Peter's Basilica for Roman Catholics. The dedication ceremony featured the reading of a specially crafted "Prayer for Europe" and performances by the European Choir, which consists of 100 singers from 20 EU member states.

== See also ==
- Conference of European Rabbis
- History of the Jews in Belgium
- History of the Jews in Europe
- History of Brussels
- Religion in the European Union
