= Fernand Ochsé =

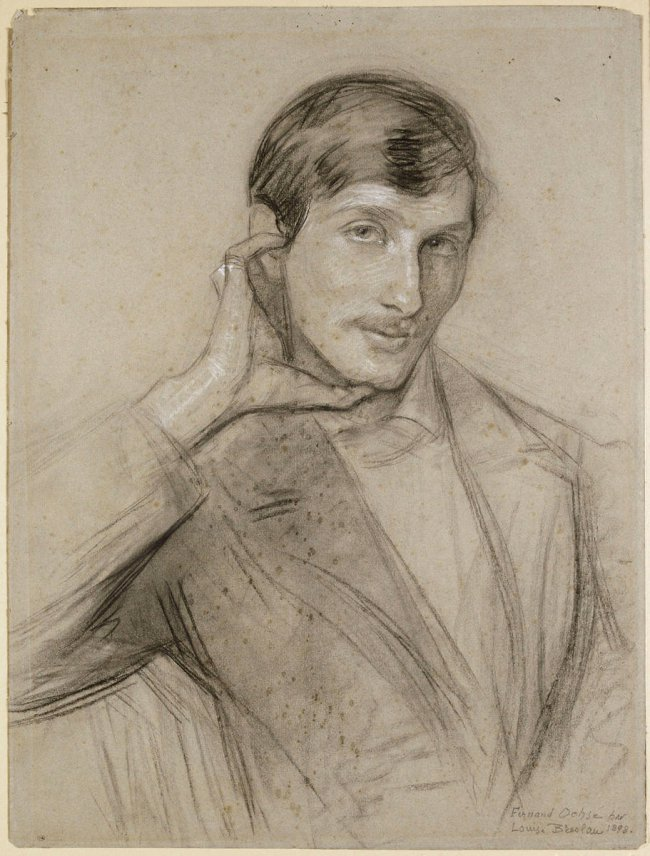
Louise-Cathérine Breslau Fernand Ochsé 1898.jpg

Fernand Ochsé (January 11, 1879 in Paris – August 1944 in [or on his way to] Auschwitz) was a French Jewish designer, dandy, author, composer, painter and art collector.

== Life ==
Fernand Ochsé came from a family of Jewish merchants. His older brother, Julien Ochsé (1876–1936) was a Lyricist. They lived in a large villa in Neuilly-sur-Seine, where they held musical evenings often attended by Parisian celebrities. Julien Ochsé married the Belgian sculptor Louise Mayer in 1906. After the death of his brother Julien, Fernand Ochsé married his widow.

Fernand Ochsé studied at the Paris Conservatory, where he met Arthur Honegger (who became his protégé), Maurice Ravel and Reynaldo Hahn, with whom he remained friends. In 1918, Honegger dedicated the ballet Le Dit des Jeux du Monde to him and in 1930 the operetta Les Aventures du Roi Pausole. He composed operettas and numerous songs.

Ochsé worked with his brother and organized readings and conferences at his request. In their villa, they held literary salons dedicated to the artistic trends of their time. He (co) created sets and staging. In 1923, he was responsible for the creation of the operetta Ciboulette by Reynaldo Hahn. In 1928, he created the costumes for La Chute de la Maison Usher by Jean Epstein

In 1934, he designed the cover of the edition of songs by composer Pierre Octave Ferroud Trois Chansons by Jules Supervielle.

He was also one of the illustrators of La Revue Musicale.

His friend Marcel Proust wrote that "Ochsé reigns," Reynaldo Hahn, Honegger, and many others wrote laudatory things about him. At the age of 103, in 2017, Gisèle Casadesus showed affection from her Montmartre house.

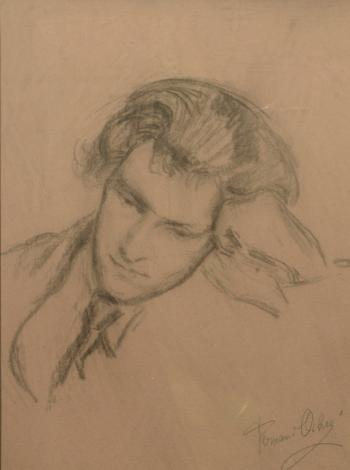
Arthur Honegger by Fernand Ochsé.

== Murdered by Nazis ==
When the Nazis attacked France in 1940, Louise and Fernand Ochsé fled, They were arrested in Cannes in July 1944 and imprisoned in Nice, then deported to the Drancy camp. They were deported on July 31, 1944 by Convoy 77 to the Auschwitz extermination camp, where they were murdered.

== Looted art: MNR 226 ==
One of the paintings from Ochsé's collection, Le souper au bal (d'après Menzel) by Edgar Degas, turned up in the collection of the Musée d'art moderne et contemporain de Strasbourg. Its reference number MNR 226, which identified it as Nazi loot returned to France's "Musées Nationale de Recupération (MNR)" inspired an article in the French weekly Le Monde, entitled Edgar Degas, MNR 226 : l'histoire d'un tableau which details the itinerary of the Degas. From Ochsé's collection and the Coutot collection it was "sold" by the Nazis through the French art dealer Hector Brame to the Kunsthalle Karlsruhe for an exchange with the Nazionalgalerie Berlin, before being recovered by the Allies and returned to the French authorities who deposited it at the museum in Strasbourg. Asked about the transaction, the art dealer's family, which still owns the galerie Brame et Lorenceau, expressed surprise.

== Artworks ==
- La poésie dans l'opérette, in Conferencia. Revue mensuelle des Lettres, 15. Juli 1938
- C'était hier (valse chantée). Texte Gustave Nadaud. Orchestre Marcel Cariven. Schallplattenaufnahme 1940;

Songs et Piano

- Odelettes. Composition. Texte Henri de Régnier. Paris : Heugel, non daté.
- Le Parc. Poèmes des "Fêtes galantes" de Paul Verlaine. Composition. Berlin : Adolph Fürstner, 1913
- Ce que je préfère. Texte und Composition. Paris : Choudens, 1933.
- Ménage moderne. Composition. Paris : Coda, 1934
- Réponse à Balzac. Composition. Texte Paul Dublin. Paris : éditions Coda, 1934.
- Me v'là ! Composition. Texte Paul Dublin. Paris : éditions Coda, 1934.
- Sur les toits. Composition. Texte P.-G. Dublin. Paris : S. Fox, 1935.
- Réponse à Balzac. Composition. Texte Paul Dublin. Paris : éditions Coda, 1934.
- Vite et doucement. Composition. Texte Paul Dublin. Paris : éditions Coda, 1934.
- L'Arithmétique. Composition. Texte P. G. Dublin. Paris : S. Fox, 1935.

== Bibliography ==
- Patrick Besnier, Henri de Régnier : de Mallarmé à l’Art déco. Paris : Fayard, 2015 ISBN 978-2-213-63177-6
- Benoit Duteurtre La Mort de Fernand Ochsé, Fayard, Paris, 2017. Commentaire biblio: Roman inspiré de la vie de Fernand Ochsé
- Ravel, Maurice (2018). L'intégrale : Correspondance (1895-1937), écrits et entretiens (in French). Paris: Le Passeur Éditeur. p. 1769. ISBN 978-2368905777. Commentaire biblio: Contient une correspondance de Maurice Ravel à Fernand Ochsé n°2208 (1928)
