= Élie-Aristide Astruc =

French Rabbi, essayist, and Grand Rabbi of Belgium

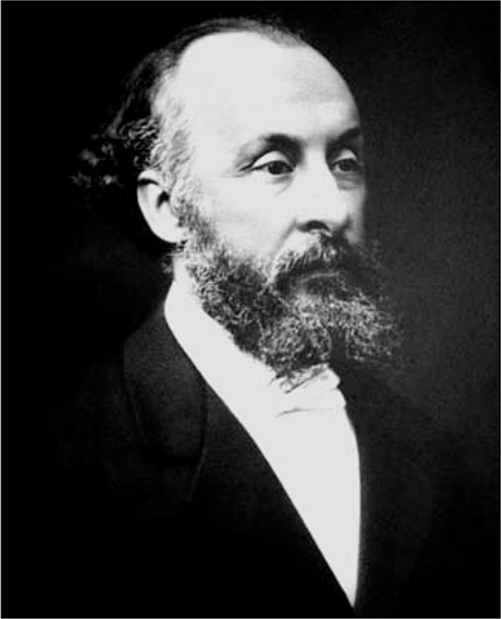
- Elie-Aristide Astruc in the late 19th century
- Title: Grand Rabbi of Belgium (1866–1879)

Personal life
- Born: 12 December 1831 Bordeaux, France
- Died: 23 February 1905 (aged 73) Brussels, Belgium

Religious life
- Religion: Judaism

Élie-Aristide Astruc (December 12, 1831 – February 23, 1905) was a French Rabbi, essayist, and the Grand Rabbi of Belgium from 1866 to 1879.

== Biography ==
Élie-Aristide Astruc was born on December 12, 1831, in Bordeaux, France, where the Astruc family had lived since the Middle Ages. After studying in Bordeaux, he was the first Sephardic pupil admitted to the rabbinical school in Metz. In 1857 he completed his training in Paris, and got his smecha from the Chief Rabbi of Paris.

In August 1857, he married Myriam Esther Egle, with whom he had three children; a daughter, Myriam, a son, Lucien, and another son, Gabriel David. In June 1866, he was appointed as the Chief Rabbi of Belgium, yet he retained his French nationality. In 1871 General Emile Mellinet commissioned Edgar Degas to paint a double portrait of himself and Rabbi Astruc to celebrate their service together in the ambulance corps during the Franco-Prussian War. He held the office of Chief Rabbi for 13 years, resigning in September 1879 and returning to Bordeaux the following year. On June 27, 1879, King Leopold II appointed him as a knight of the order of Leopold, and in 1887, he was elected as the Chief Rabbi of Bayonne. He died on February 23, 1905, in Brussels, Belgium and is buried in the Jewish cemetery in Uccle.

== Position on Judaism ==
Throughout his career, Astruc strongly advocated for the Jewish world to open up to the modern world, yet he stressed the need for retaining one's faith in Jewish dogma. He, like many Jews of his time, believed that to combat Antisemitism, European Jews must, to an extent, assimilate. Astruc also called for a rational explanation of the Bible, questioning its dogmatic manifestation in the Western world. He advocated for Jewish burial in Jewish squares within secular cemeteries and hoped for an evolution in the status of women in Judaism, particularly the possibility of remarrying even without having to obtain a Ghet (divorce certificate). His approach was violently criticized in France, but received a more favorable reception in Belgium.

== Works ==
- The Jews and Louis Veuillot, Paris 1859;
- Translation into French of the Ritual Poems of the Portuguese Jews, Paris, La Librairie israite, 1865;
- Abridged history of the Jews and their beliefs, Paris, 1869;
- Interviews on Judaism, its dogma and its morals, (set of sermons of Astruc), Paris, Alphonse Lemerre, 1879;
- Historical origins and causes of anti-Semitism, 1884;
