= Jewish Museum of Belgium =

Museum of Jewish history in Brussels, Belgium

- Musée juif de Belgique (French); Joods Museum van België (Dutch)
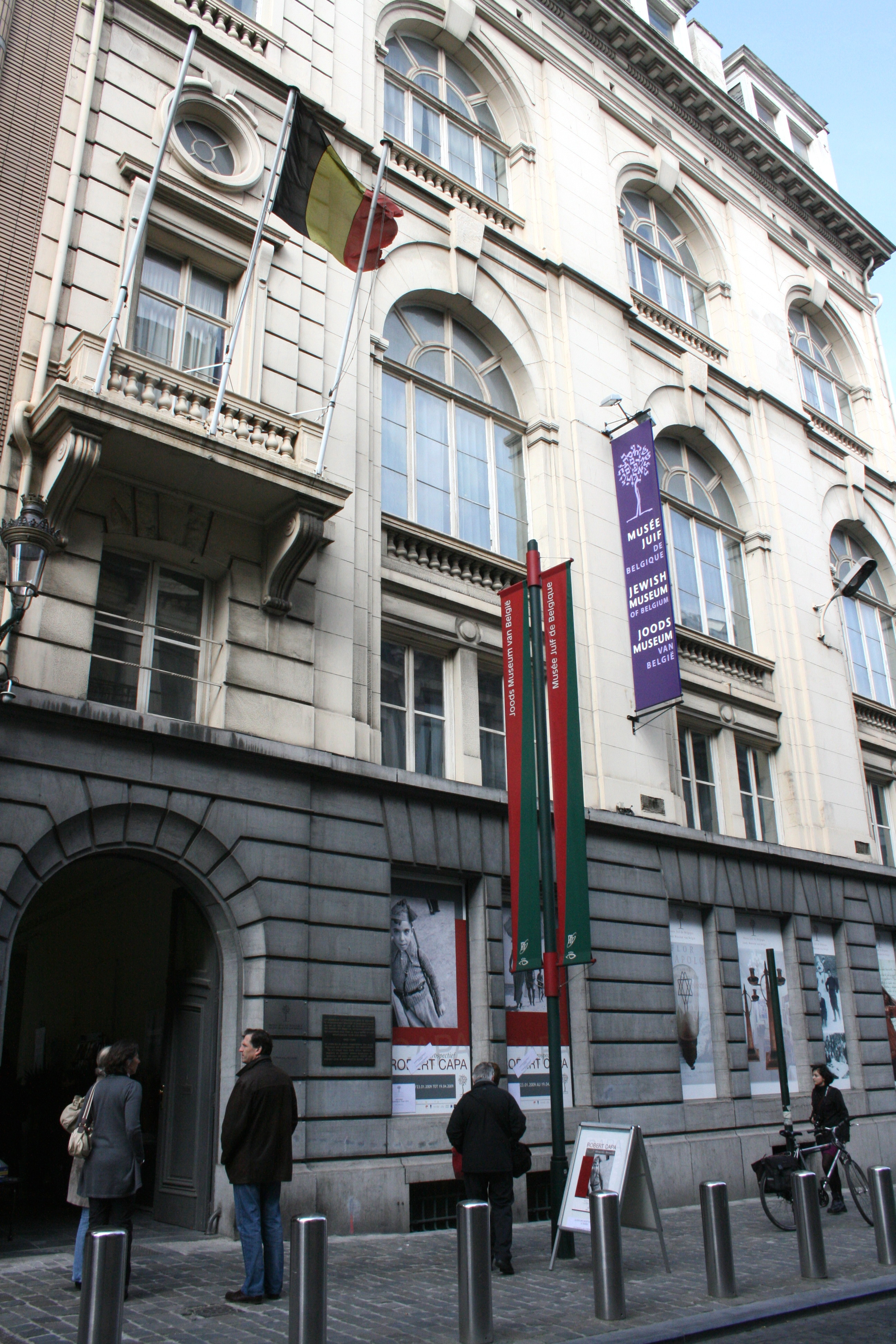
- Exterior of the museum
- Interactive fullscreen map
- Established: 9 March 1989; 37 years ago
- Location: Rue des Minimes / Minimenstraat 21, 1000 City of Brussels, Brussels-Capital Region, Belgium
- Coordinates: 50°50′27″N 4°21′12″E
- Type: Jewish museum
- Website: www.mjb-jmb.org/en

The Jewish Museum of Belgium (French: Musée juif de Belgique; Dutch: Joods Museum van België) is a museum in central Brussels, Belgium, focusing on the history of the Jews in Belgium. It is located at 21, rue des Minimes/Minimenstraat in the Sablon/Zavel district of Brussels.

== History ==
The idea of founding a Jewish museum emerged in the late 1970s and was based on two motifs: the lack of a Jewish museum dealing with history and art, although Judaism has been present in Belgium since the Middle Ages, and the small number of public collections.

As part of the celebrations surrounding Belgium's 150th anniversary in 1979, Baron Bloch, then-President of the Central Council and alongside his successor in office, Baron Schnek, suggested driving exhibition of art and history of Belgian Jewry. The event was successful, and a small group was founded in 1981, which put together a collection, as well as a financing basis and the purchase of a property. Official support was finally gained in the mid-1980s. Initially, the Ministry of Labor and Finance, and later also the French and Flemish-speaking communities and the regions, agreed to support the group's efforts.

Work continued on makeshift premises above the Beth Israel Synagogue on the Rue de Stalingrad/Stalingradstraat, which were provided by the Central Council. The museum has been compiling its collection since 1990 and installed its first permanent exhibition there. In 2005, the company moved to its current premises on the Rue des Minimes/Minimenstraat.

=== May 2014 shooting ===
On 24 May 2014, four people were killed in a shooting at the museum. The attack occurred at 3:50 p.m. when the perpetrator entered the building carrying a backpack and weapons. The victims were two men and two women: an Israeli couple who were visiting the museum, a French intern, and a Belgian museum employee. On 30 May 2014, the perpetrator, Mehdi Nemmouche, was arrested in Marseille; he is a French national who had joined jihadists in Syria in 2013. He was sentenced to life imprisonment in March 2019.

== Collection and scope ==
The museum has a collection of items that relate to Jewish customs from Europe, Asia, and Africa, dating back as far as the 18th century and mostly from the region to the east of river Rhine and countries around the Mediterranean. It holds 750 objects of Judaica, 1,250 works of art, and an archive of 20,000 photographs, 5,000 posters, compact discs, LPs, and compact cassettes. It also has six thematic libraries containing a total of 25,000 works and editions, including works in Yiddish and Hebrew, works of Jewish artists, and genealogies.

== Building ==
The museum is housed in the former Deutsche Schule, a German-language school founded in 1892 by the Deutscher Schulverein in Brüssel. The school originally operated in the former Impasse du Parc/Parkgang (today's Rue des Colonies/Koloniënstraat) before moving to these premises, designed by the architect O. Flanneau in 1900. The foundation stone was laid in 1901 and the building was inaugurated the following year. The complex initially consisted of two classroom wings separated by playgrounds, and included a hall, service rooms, as well as two shops. The school closed during the First World War, after which the building served as an annexe of the Belgian State Archives.

The main building is a monumental example of eclectic architecture with neoclassical elements. It has four storeys, including a mezzanine, arranged in four wide bays beneath a mansard roof. The rendered façade features imitation joints above a blue stone ground floor. A vertical composition rises from the string course, with a left-hand rusticated projection marked by a round-arched entrance and glazed door set beneath an entablature and a balustraded balcony, surmounted by a oculus. The three right-hand bays are articulated with colossal pilasters and deep round-arched windows with imposts, keystones, balustrades, and characteristic muntin patterns. The ground and mezzanine floors contain two- and three-light windows replacing the former shop fronts, and the elevation is topped by a classical cornice with dormers set between pedestals.

The rear wing, on the Rue de la Samaritaine/Samaritanessestraat, is more austere. It rises three storeys over five bays beneath a mansard roof and is characterised by broad rectangular windows set under I-beams.

== See also ==
- The Holocaust in Belgium
- List of museums in Brussels
- History of Brussels
- Culture of Belgium
