= Provincial Mausoleum of Political Prisoners and Deportees =

- Belgium
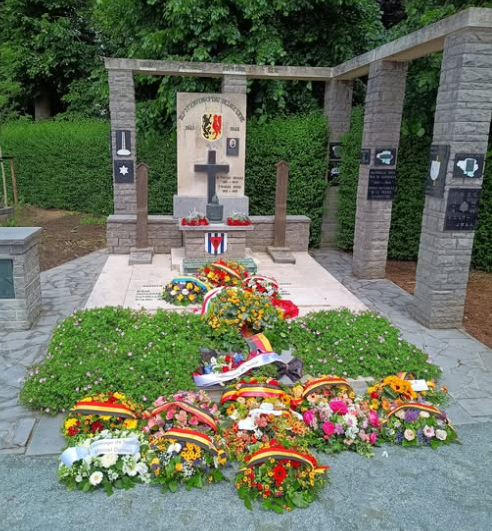
- For Political Prisoners and Deportees during World War II
- Unveiled: 1959
- Location: 50°48′04″N 3°06′45″E; Menen, West-Flanders
- Designed by: Maurice Dupont
- Total burials: 2

Burials by war
- World War II
- ZIJ STIERVEN OPDAT BELGIE LEVE (They died so Belgium could live)

The Provincial Mausoleum of Political Prisoners commemorates the political prisoners from West Flanders from the Second World War

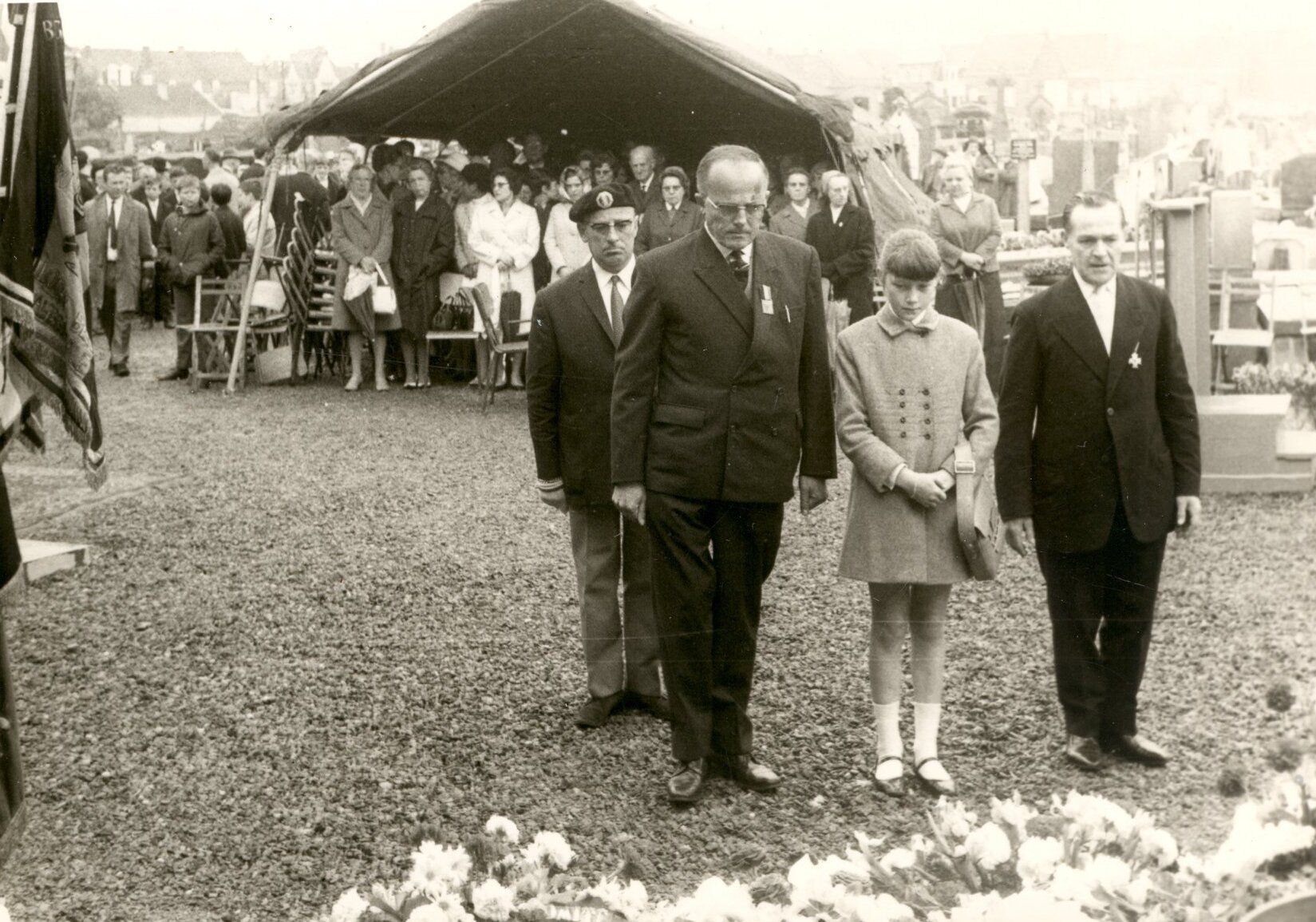
In the photo you see three of the driving forces. In the foreground Maurice Dupont, founder with daughter Iris. On the right Fernand Pauwels and on the left Josephe Boddaerd.

The Provincial Mausoleum of Political Prisoners and Deportees is a war memorial in Menen, West Flanders, Belgium erected in memory of the Belgian political prisoners who were deported to concentration camps by the German occupiers during World War II. Of the fourteen deported residents of Menen, only four survived the concentration camps.

== Introduction ==
Maurice Dupont and Fernand Pauwels were both Belgian resistance fighters in the South-West Flanders region who were arrested by the German occupiers during the Second World War and deported to concentration camps. Despite the inhumane conditions, they survived the camps and returned to Belgium after the war. Together they took the initiative to establish the Provincial Mausoleum for Political Prisoners of West Flanders in Menen, in memory of the political prisoners of world war II.

== History ==
=== Begin ===
On November 1, 1957, the mausoleum was founded by survivors Maurice Dupont and Fernand Pauwels. The association was named: "Commemoration Committee of the Provincial Mausoleum of Political Prisoners of West Flanders". They received support from local authorities such as those of the province of West Flanders and the city of Menen, and various local and national organizations such as: the Secret Army, the deported and work refusers, the Leopoldists and Albertists, the Widows and orphans of deported and many more.

=== First ceremony ===
The first ceremony (14th of June, 1959) of the Provincial Mausoleum of Political Prisoners of West Flanders was held at the monument in the old city cemetery. Here the monument was inaugurated and an annual tradition was started. Afterwards a pilgrimage followed to the monument on the city market, where a reception followed at the city hall.

=== Yearly tradition ===
Every year on Father's Day (formerly, now somewhere in June), a commemoration ceremony takes place at the mausoleum. One of the central parts of this ceremony is the 'Kampappèl', in which the great-grandchildren of the 4 survivors read about the horrors of the concentration camps, and were names of eighteen concentration camps are called out and flowers are laid by the grandchildren and great-grandchildren of former political prisoners. This ceremony is attended by family members, survivors, representatives of the Belgian government, representatives of Belgian Armed Forces and foreign diplomats.

The mausoleum not only has a historical importance, but also a symbolic value as a place of remembrance and reflection. It emphasizes the importance of resistance against oppression and passing on history to future generations. In addition to this monument, there are several memorial sites in Belgium that honor the victims of the Second World War, such as Fort Breendonk and Kazerne Dossin.

== Present-day ==
The Provincial Mausoleum of Political Prisoners and Deportees in Menen remains an important place of remembrance. Every year on the first Sunday of June, (previously on Father's Day) a commemoration ceremony takes place in honour of the victims. This ceremony is organised by the Royal Society of the Bearers of the Decorations and Medals of Belgium, regional department Kortrijk.

The mausoleum, located at the back of the Old City Cemetery (park cemetery) in the Ieperstraat and Zandputstraat, is maintained and supported by the province of West Flanders and the city of Menen. It remains accessible to visitors who want to reflect on the history and sacrifices of the political prisoners and deportees during the Second World War.

In addition to the annual commemorations, there are also initiatives such as the placement of stumbling stones in Menen, Lauwe and Rekkem, which pay tribute to the victims and keep their stories alive. These efforts underline the continuing importance of the mausoleum as a symbol of remembrance and awareness.

== Program (modern) ==
The (general) Program of the Ceremony is:

- 10:00: Arrival of officials and personalities
- 10:00: Start of the ceremony
- 10:05: Arrival of the torch of the concentration camp Flossenbürg and West-Flanders
- 10:10: Ignition of the torch of West-Flanders by the mayor of the city of Menen
- 10:15: Ignition of the torch of Flossenbürg by the chairman of the National association of Flossenbürg
- 10:20: Ignition of the torch of the Mausoleum (already at the monument) by the chairman of the National association of Flossenbürg
- 10:25: Speech by the mayor of the city of Menen
- 10:35: Flag hoist by the chairman of the committee of the Mausoleum ("groet aan de vlag")
- 10:40: Youth's view of the world (text read out by teenager about their view on the (modern) world)
- 10:55: Kampappèl (A text about the horror of the camps, read out by the great-grandchildren of political prisoners) And flower laying (rose) by great-grandchildren of political prisoners (part of the Kampappel)
- 11:05: Minute of silence in honor of those who died in the concentration camps
- 11:20: Flower laying by authorities and invitees
- 11:30: La Brabançonne (Belgian National Anthem)
- 11:35: Extinguishing of the Torches of the Province West-Flanders and the concentration camp Flossenbürg
- 11:40: Salute from the flag procession at the mausoleum
- 11:45: End of the Ceremony (and signing of the tribute book)

=== Kampappèl ===
The Kampappèl is part of the annual ceremony, what happens during the Kampappèl goes as follows:

1. Text read by the grandchildren, great-grandchildren and children of political prisoners
2. Calling out the names of 18 concentration camps
3. During the calling out of the names, the grandchildren, great-grandchildren and children of political prisoners lay a rose on the monument for each of the 18 concentration camps that are being called out

=== Youth's view of the (modern) world ===
The Youth's view of the (modern) world is a new addition to the ceremony, A child (teenager) reads a text about his view of the (modern/current) world. The teenager explains his concerns of the (modern) world and his fears for the future.

=== Salute from the flag procession at the mausoleum ===
At the end of the ceremony, the flag bearers hold a finale salute to the monument in honour of those who died in the concentration camps.

== Monument ==
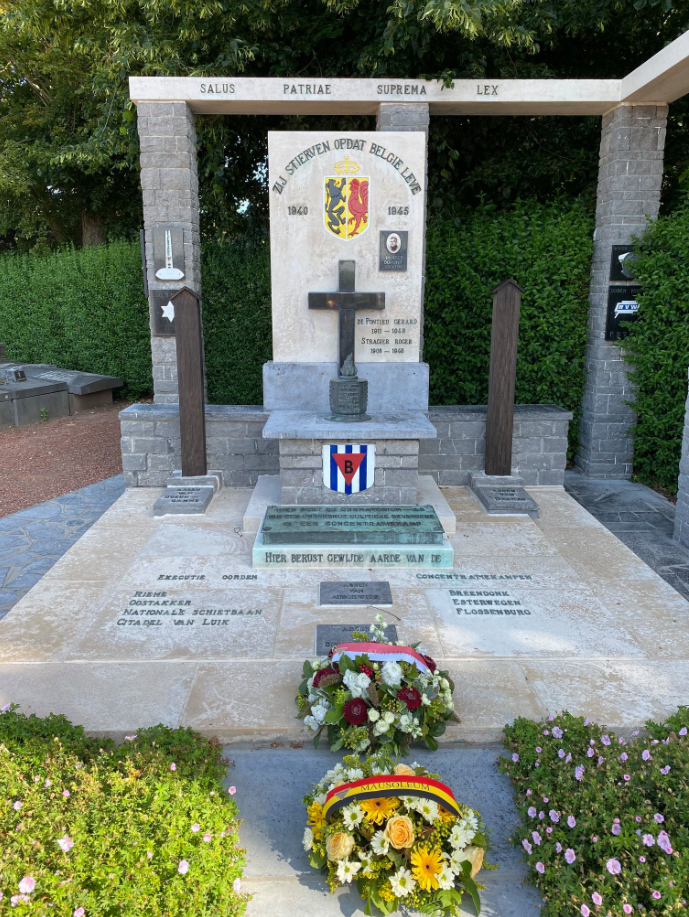
The monument

=== Approval of the monument ===
On 18 January 1958, Maurice Dupont sent a letter to (then) mayor René Gombert asking him to make a piece of land available on the old

municipal cemetery in Menen for the construction of a Mausoleum. The piece of land they had in mind was at the end of the cemetery, with a surface area of 20 square metres (4 by 5 metres). On 6 March 1958, approval from the city of Menen followed. The monument would become the property of the commemoration committee, but the land would remain the property of the city of Menen.

=== Fundraising ===
From the approval of the city of Menen, various initiatives were organised. By selling support cards, asking for subsidies from various West Flemish municipalities, collections and organising film evenings, people tried to raise funds. In the archives of the committee, a proposal was even made to sell thirty pigeons to raise money. The board members, their children and some sympathisers sacrificed a lot of their free time to make these initiatives a reality. An appeal was also made in the newspaper to make this fundraising known to the people of Menen.

=== Construction of the monument ===
The mausoleum was built by the Vandewalle brothers. Charles Vandewalle (one of the brothers who built the monument) was secretary of the deported department of Menen. The design and ideas of the monument were mainly drawn and designed by Maurice Dupont, but an architect was called in to help. The construction of the monument took place in several phases:

1. First, 3 cellars were built for 2 places each, where 2 people could be buried each
2. Then the mausoleum in white stone (Vaurion) was placed
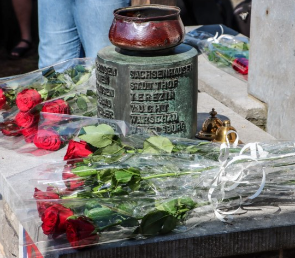
  The Chalice (with roses from the Kampappèl)

=== Chalice and box for crematorium ashes ===
Information was obtained from various associations and workshops. Finally, "Pascal Norga" was chosen, a copper and bronze foundry from Etikhove, which also specialised in gravestone art. Both pieces were designed by Maurice Dupont. The names of 18 concentration camps are listed on the chalice. This chalice can be filled with 5 litres of kerosene. During the ceremony, a pilot light is lit. There is a lid with a bronze flame on the chalice. On the lid of the box for the crematorium ashes it says: "Here rest the crematorium ashes of an unknown political prisoner in a concentration camp."

== Executive board ==
The Board of the Commemoration Committee for Political Prisoners of the Second World War:

	1957 - 1964	1964 - 1985	1985 - 1997	1997 - 1998	1998 - Nu
Chairman	Maurice Dupont	Maurice Dupont	Georgette de Pontieu	Georgette de Pontieu	Yves Dupont
Vice-Chairman	Roger Vandenginste	Georgette de Pontieu	Yves Dupont	Yves Dupont	Gilbert Pauwels
Secretary	Oscar Vanlandeghem	Oscar Vanlandeghem	Hendrik Rivière	Hendrik Rivière	Hendrik Rivière
Treasurer	Urbain Vanlandeghem	Urbain Vanlandeghem	Urbain Vanlandeghem	Bjorn Rivière	Bjorn Rivière
Members	3		2	1	5

=== Maurice Dupont ===
Maurice Dupont (founder of the commemoration committee) was a former political prisoner during World War II, he survived three years in various prisons and concentration camps (prisons in Kortrijk, Bruges, St-Gillis, Gross Strelitz, Laband, and Hameln), and the concentration camps of Esterwegen, Buchenwald, and Flossenbürg), and survived two death marches. Maurice escaped during the second death march (from Flossenbürg to Dachau) when he ran away into the fields around the town of Rötz and found refuge with the Reitinger farming family. Maurice was the founder of the commemoration committee and the driving force behind the commemoration. He chaired the commemoration committee from November 1, 1957, until his death on October 23, 1985.

Maurice his son; Yves Dupont is the current chairman since 1998, after the death of Georgette de Pontieu. Maurice his daughter; Iris Dupont is a member of the commemoration committee. Both were part of the committee since they were 18 and regularly attended meetings when they were just children. The grandchildren of both Yves and Iris Dupont participate in the meetings and the ceremonies since they were children.

== Representation ==
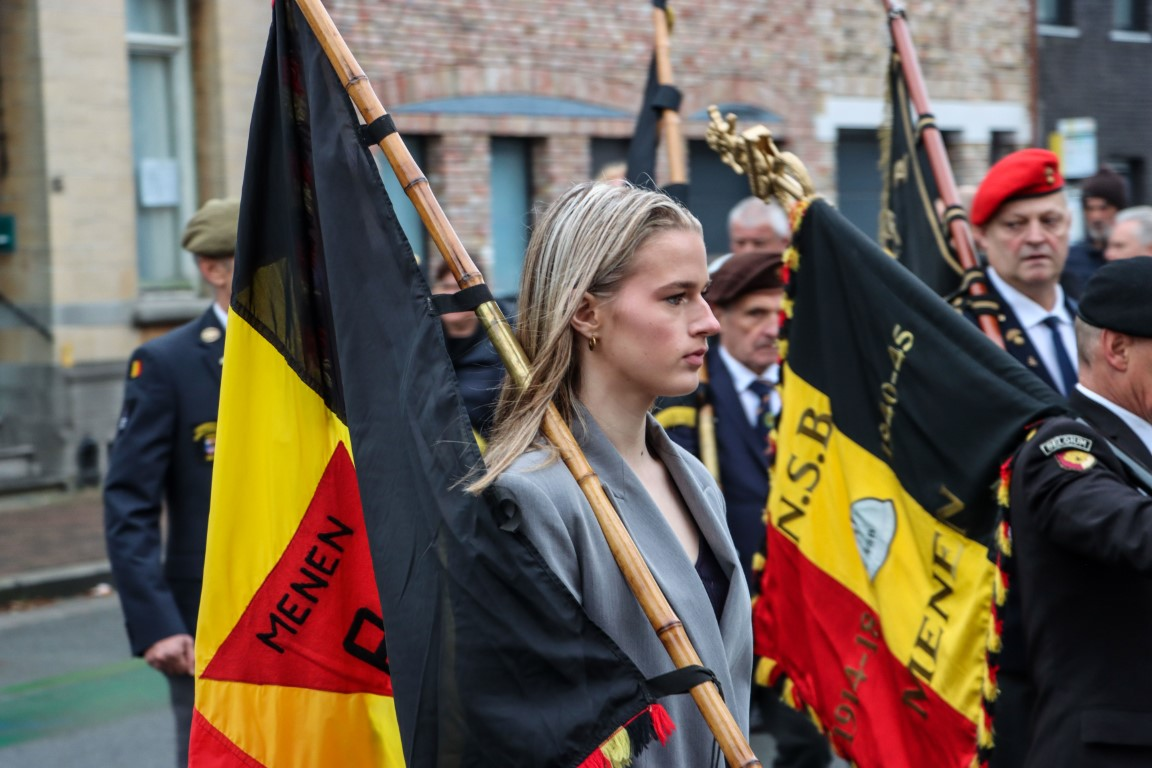
Flag on armistice day (Menen)

The Provincial mausoleum is represented by members of the commemoration committee who attend other ceremonies in the area around Menen and in the province West-Flanders.

The provincial Mausoleum also has a flag, which is mostly carried along to some commemoration ceremonies. The flag is carried by one of the grandchildren of Iris Dupont (daughter of Maurice Dupont), just like the torches during the ceremony, these are also carried by two of the grandchildren of Iris Dupont.

The president and secretary regularly attend these other ceremonies. When they aren't able to be there, one of their grandchildren (who is a member of the board) replaces them.

The members attend (yearly) the commemoration ceremonies of the 1st November (commemoration of the fallen soldiers of the Belgian army), 11th of November (commemoration of the armistice of WW1), 15th of November (Te Deum in commemoration of King's day), 8th of May (commemoration of the end of WW2), 17th of February (commemoration of the death of King Albert I and all royal family members) 3rd Sunday in June (commemoration of the bombardments of the locks in Menen), at the unveiling of stumbling stones (no fixed date)... These are the most prominent commemoration ceremonies where the commemoration committee is represented by members of the board.

== Pictures ==
=== Pictures of present-day ceremonies ===
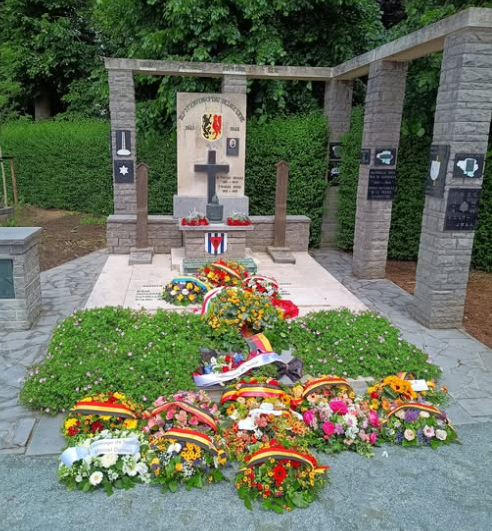
The flowers at the monument

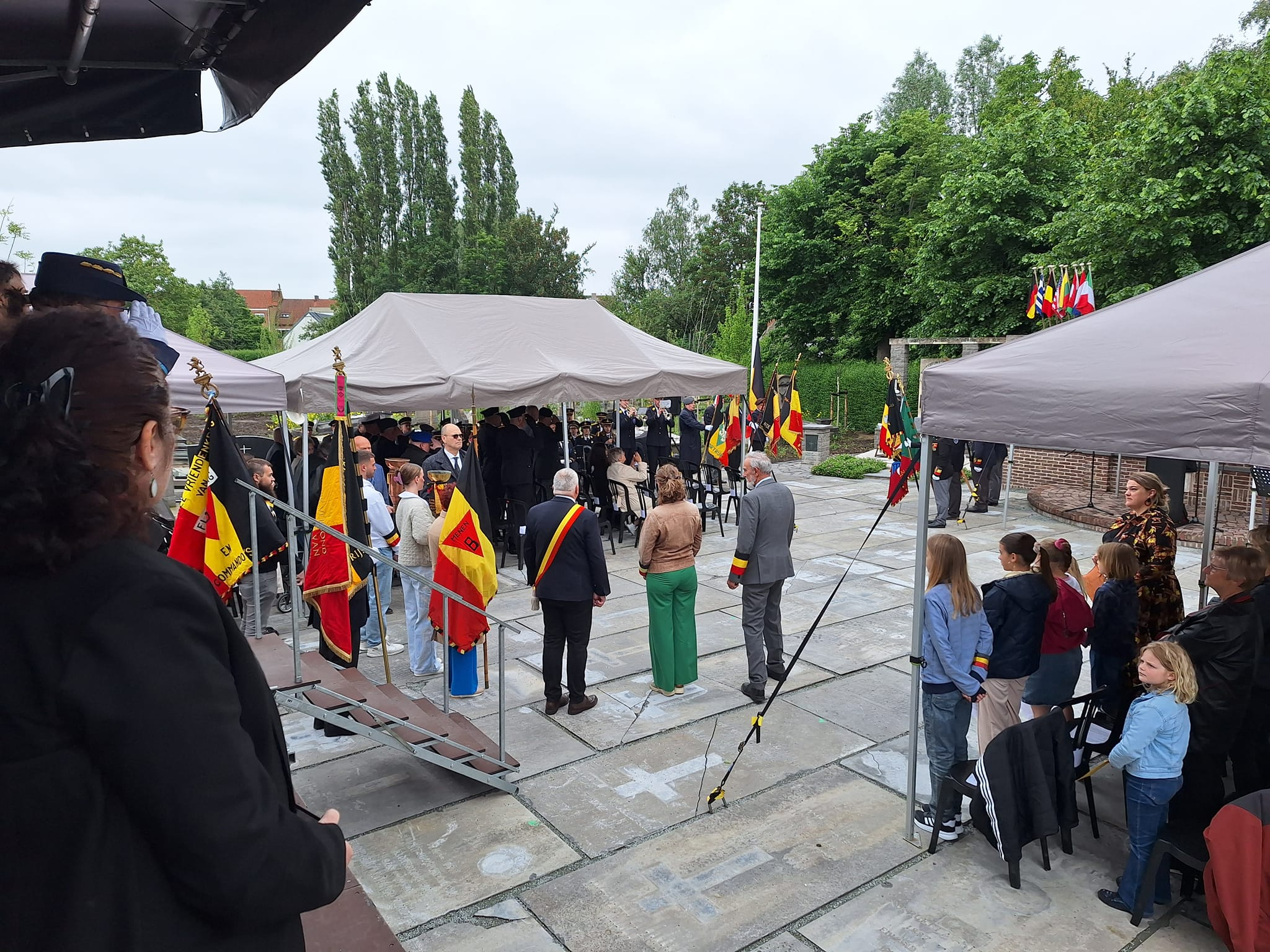
Arrival of the torchers

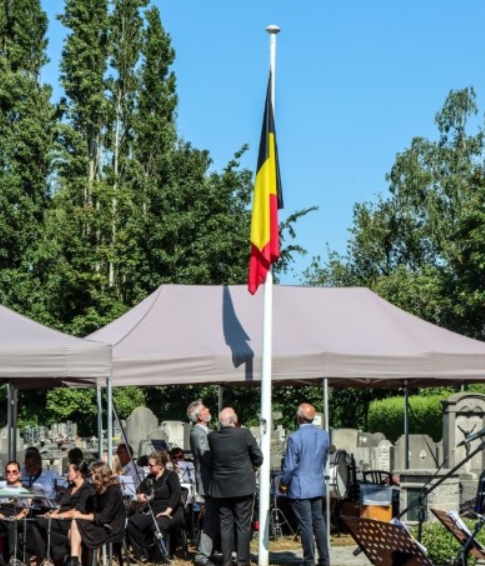
Salute to the flag

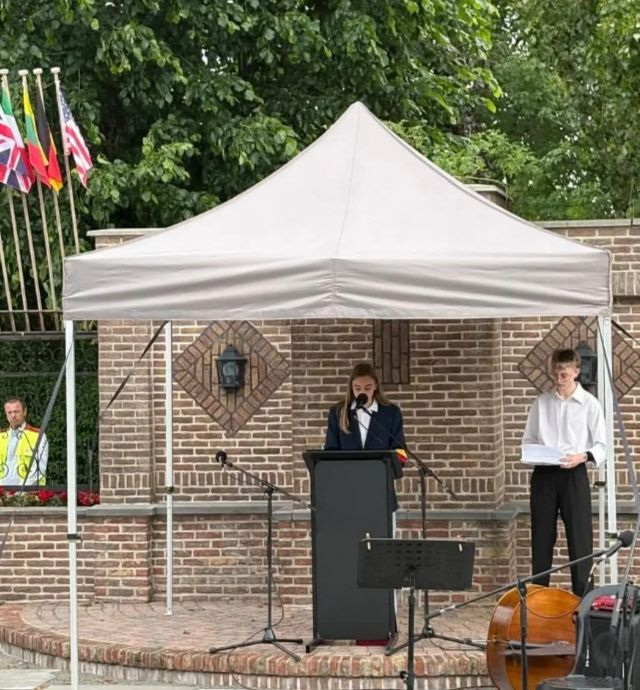
Youth's view on the (modern) world

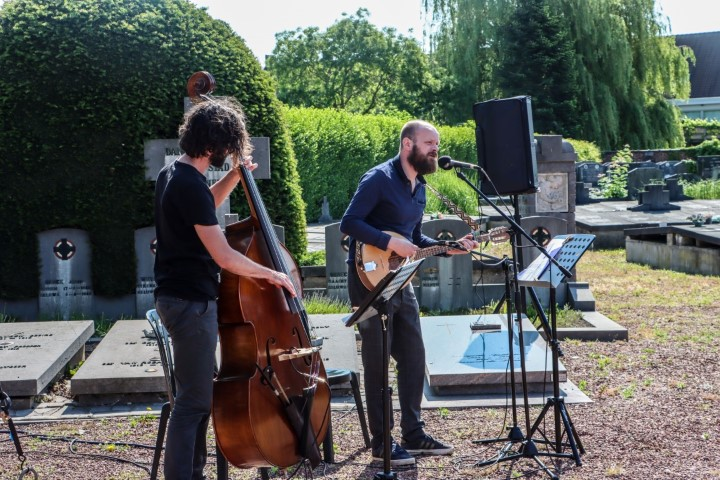
Live music (by David and Thomas)

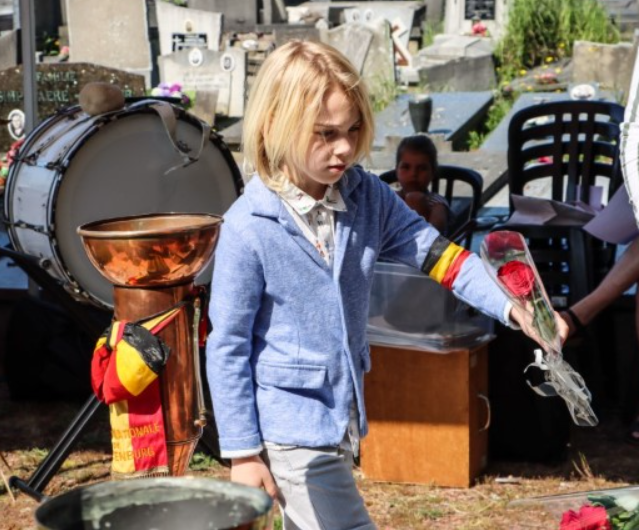
Flower laying (Kampappèl)

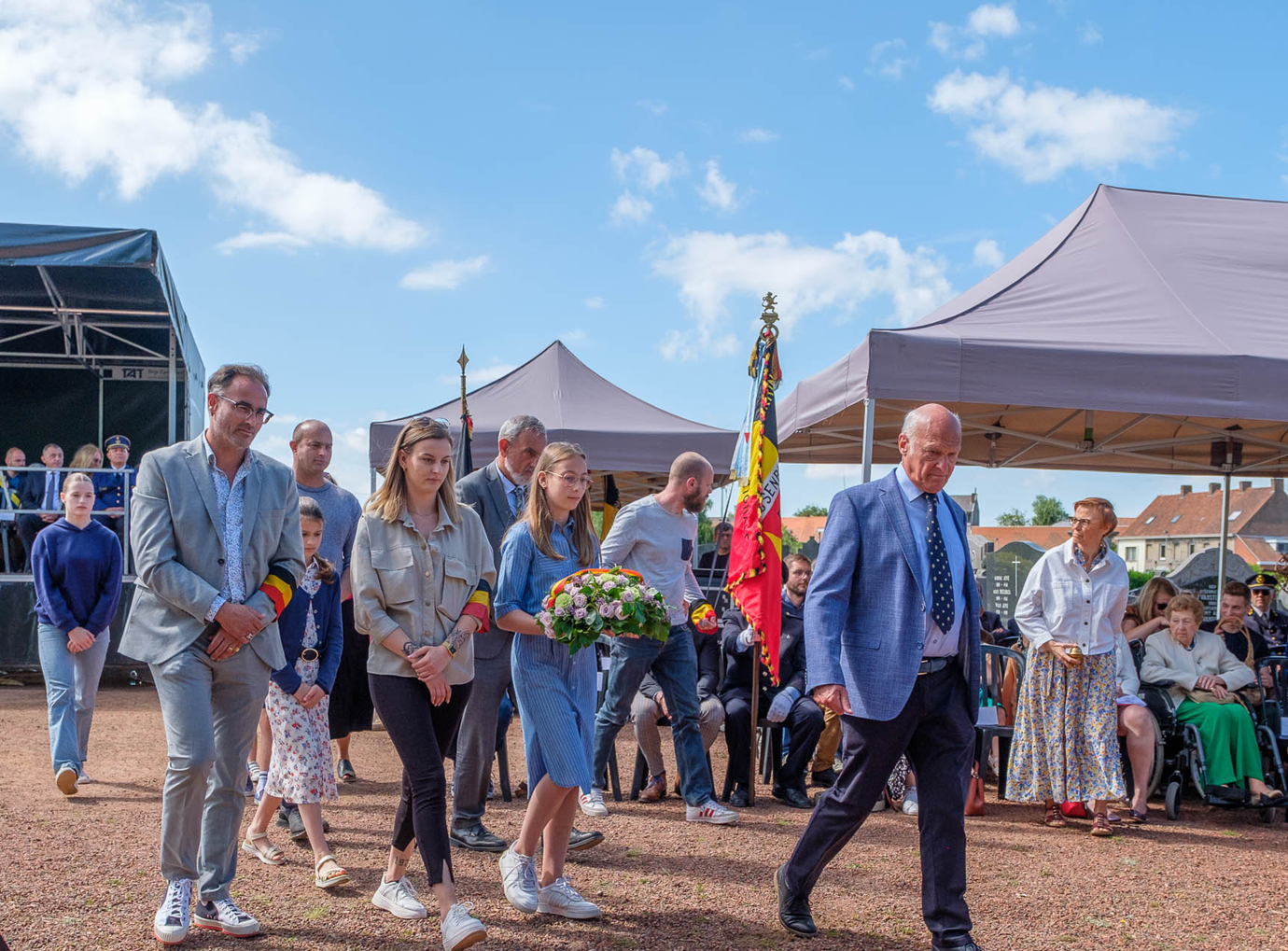
Flower laying (Family Dupont)

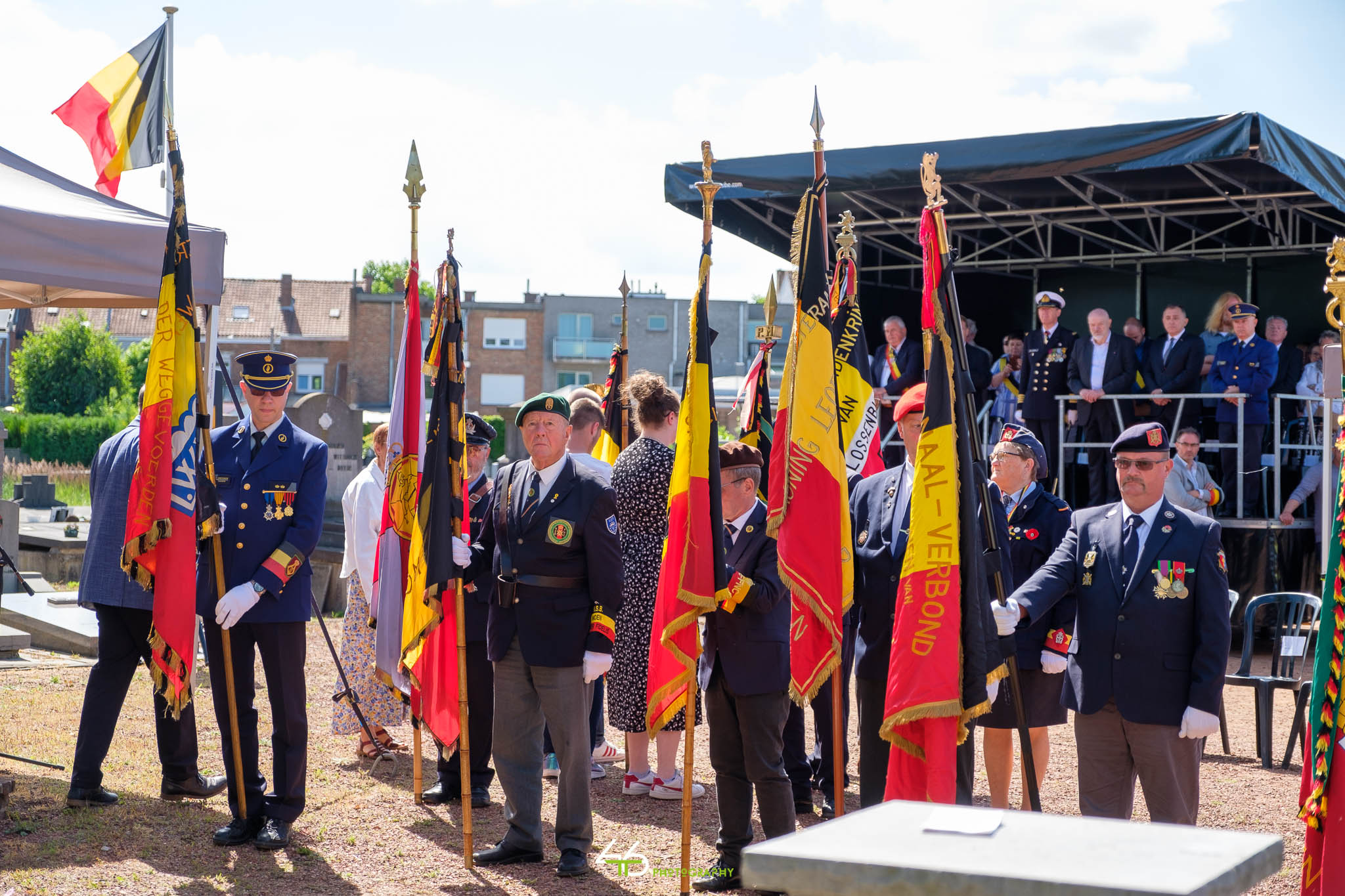
Salute to the monument from the flag procession

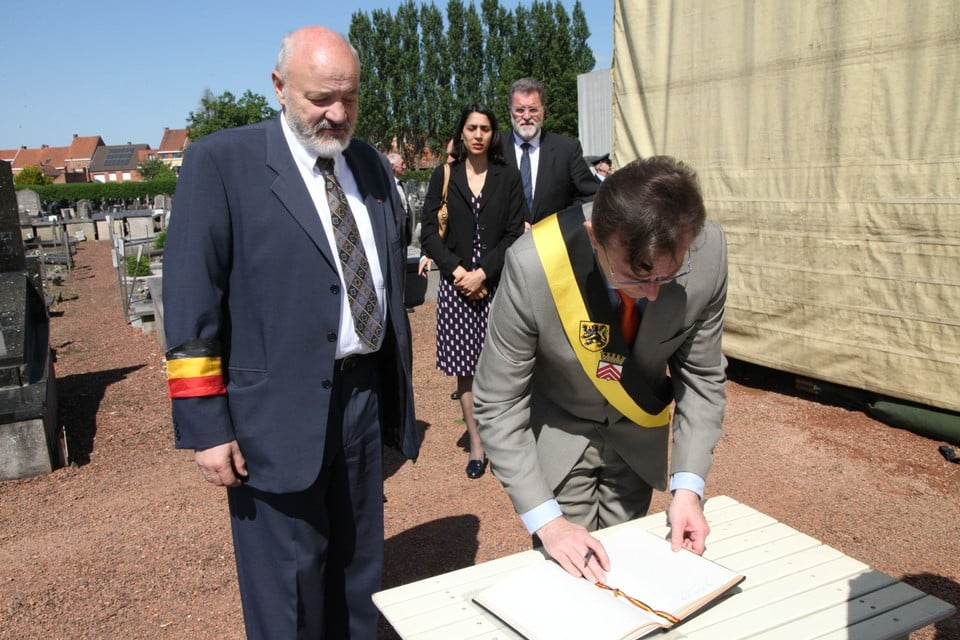
signing of the tribute book

=== Pictures of past ceremonies ===
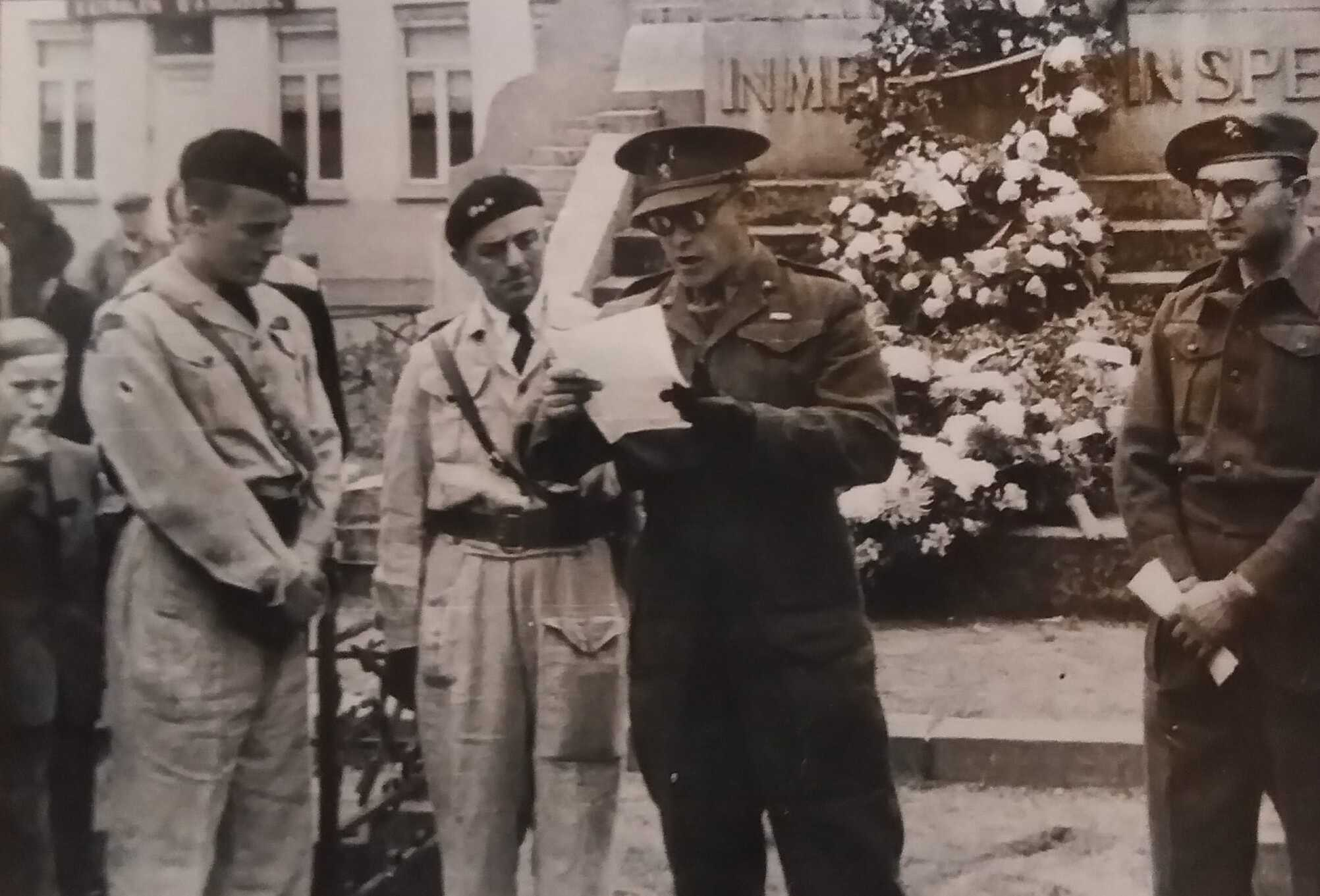
First ceremony (1959)

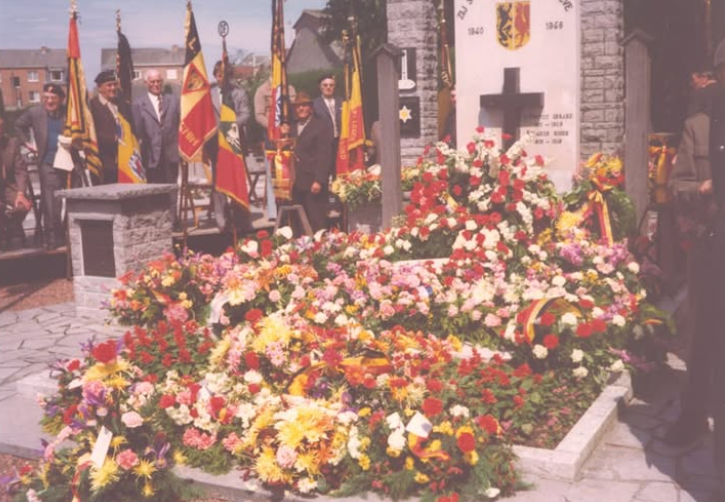
The flowers at the monument

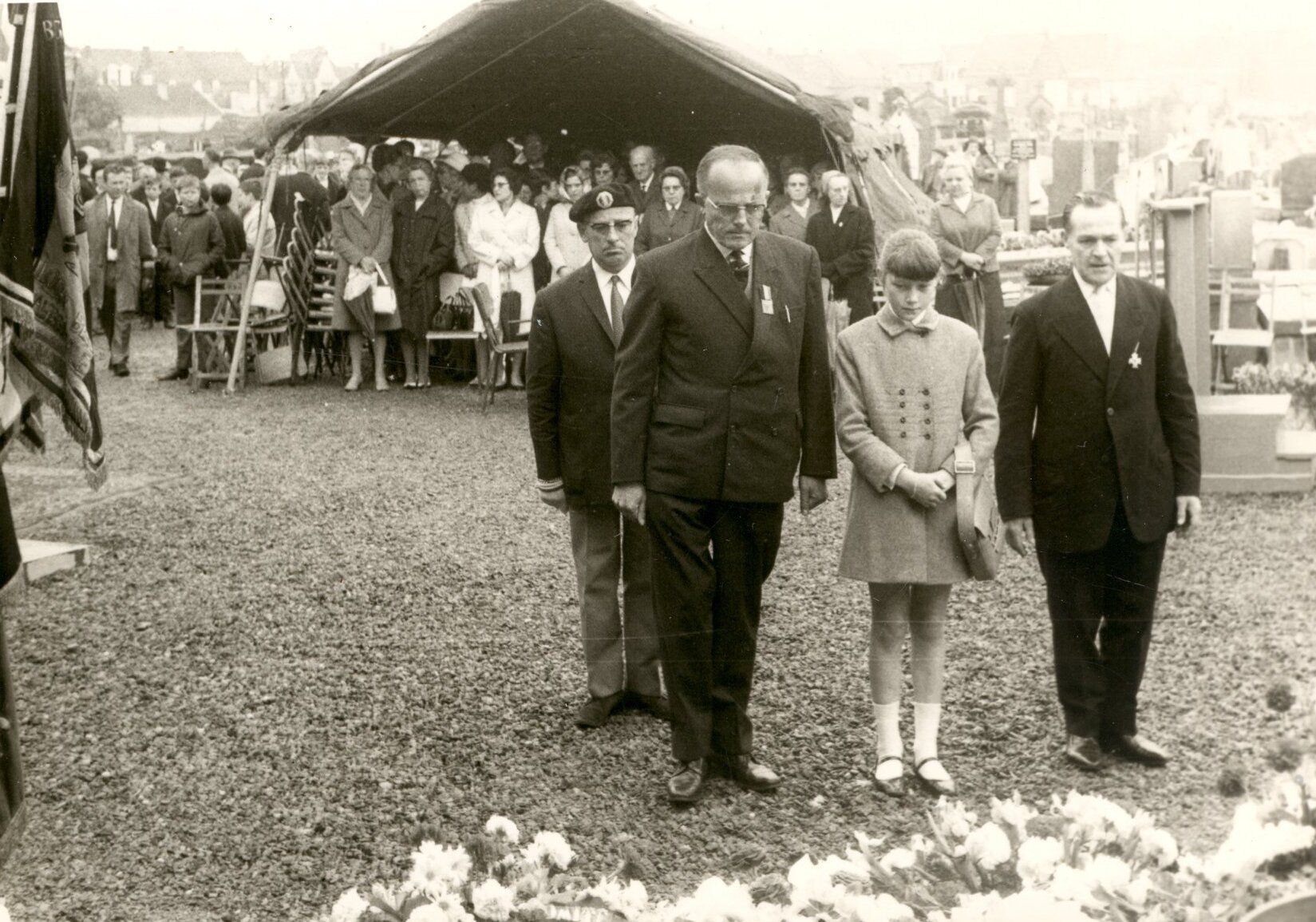
Flower laying by families

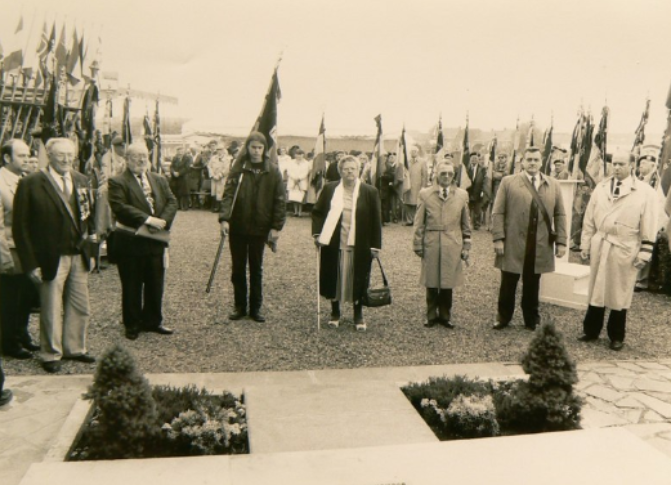
Flower laying by families

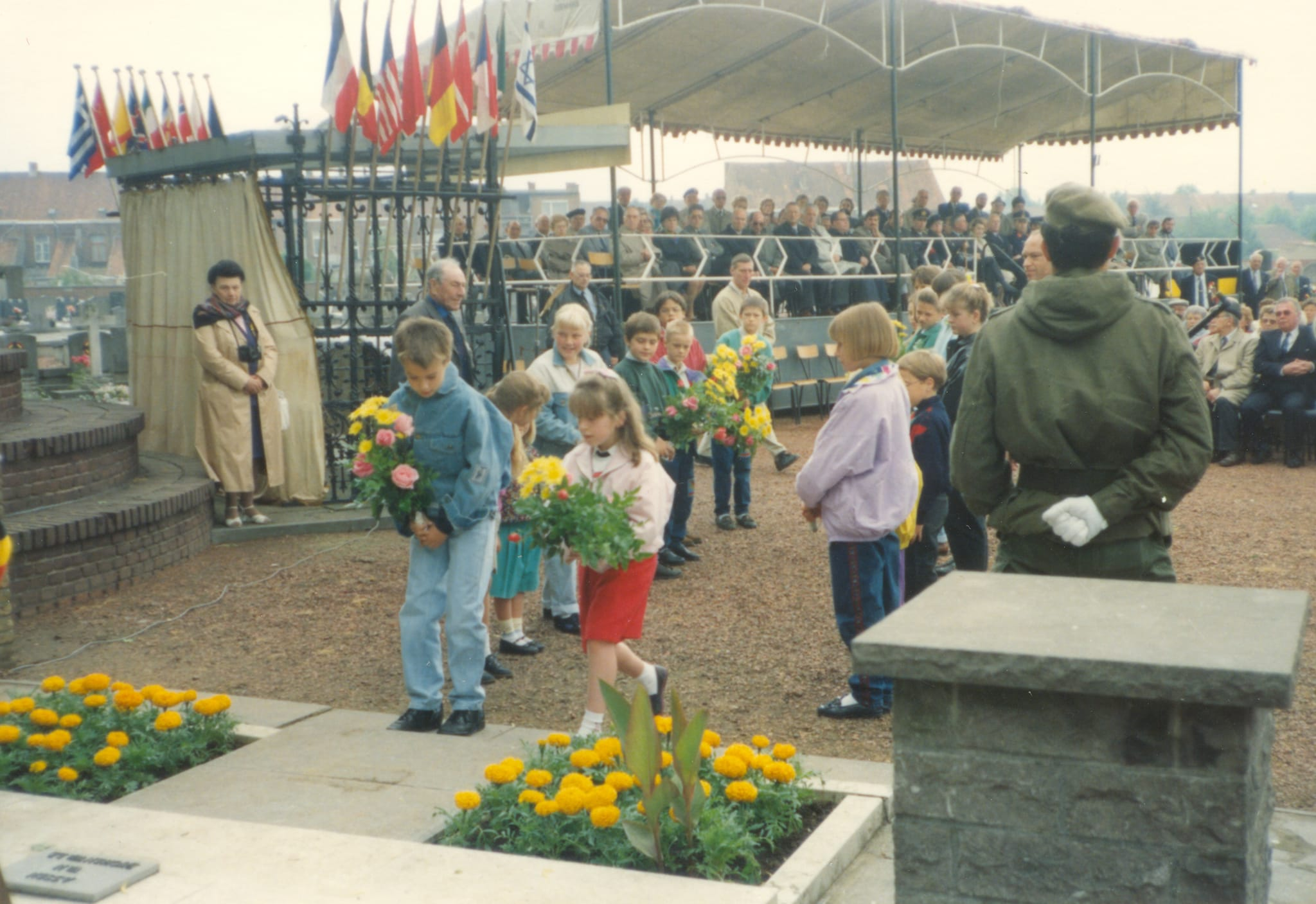
Flower laying (Kampappèl)

== See also ==
- Belgian resistance
- political prisoners
- Fort Breendonk
- German occupied Belgium
