= Kazerne Dossin =

Kazerne Dossin is a former army barracks in Mechelen, Belgium, currently known as "Hof van Habsburg". It may refer to:

== Current ==
- Kazerne Dossin Memorial, Museum and Documentation Centre on Holocaust and Human Rights (front aisle, since 2012)
- Private apartments (side aisles, since the 1980s)
- Mechelen city archive (back aisle, since 1989)

== Historical ==
- Mechelen transit camp, a detention and deportation camp operated by the Nazis during World War II (1942—1944)
