= Jan Caubergh =

Belgian serial killer (1934–2013)

- Born: Jan Caubergh; 18 September 1934; Lanaken, Belgium
- Died: 29 November 2013 (aged 79); Bruges, Belgium
- Conviction: Murder
- Penalty: Death; commuted to life imprisonment

Details
- Victims: 3
- Country: Belgium

Jan Caubergh (18 September 1934 – 29 November 2013) was a Belgian serial killer. In 1966, he received 25 years of forced labour for his participation in a robbery in which his gang shot a nurse who was severely maimed and later committed suicide. In 1977 he was released on parole.

On 21 February 1979, he raped his pregnant neighbour, 19-year-old Yvonne Smits, shooting her in the back of the head afterwards. Later he strangled his girlfriend, 24-year-old Rina Van Geldorp and their five-month-old son Nicky. He also wounded a policeman with a Long Rifle, later rigging up his police car in an attempt to injure another two policemen. After a manhunt lasting several days in which he hid on barges on the Albert Canal and a bottle stopper factory in Deurne, he was arrested in a hotel in Atheneumbuurt, Antwerp. He was given the death sentence, but it was later converted to a life imprisonment.

In 2003 Caubergh stabbed a prison guard with a cake knife during a trip out of the central prison in Leuven. The guard survived the attack. In September 2010, Caubergh received another 12 years in prison. He spent more than 45 years of his life in prison, the last 34 and a half of which were uninterrupted. That made him one of the longest-serving detainees in the country.

On 5 November 2013 several reports from the Belgian media announced that Caubergh had died in the penitentiary complex in Bruges. This was denied a few days later by the Belgian Prison System. He eventually died on 29 November 2013. At that time he was the oldest detainee in Belgium.

== See also ==
- List of serial killers by country
