= Abraham Bueno de Mesquita =

Dutch actor

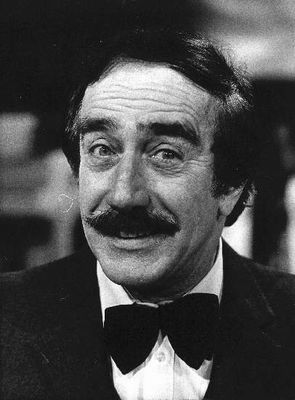
Abraham Bueno de Mesquita

Abraham "Appie" Bueno de Mesquita (Dutch: [aːˈbraːɦɑm ˈɑpi ˈbʋɛnoː də mɛsˈkitaː], Ladino: [aˈβɾaham ˈapi ˈbweno de mesˈkita]; 23 July 1918 in Amsterdam – 19 August 2005 in Lelystad) was a Dutch comedian, actor and stage artist, well known for his ability to make funny faces.

In World War II, Bueno de Mesquita was imprisoned in the Dossin Barracks in Mechelen, Belgium on account of being Sephardi Jewish, and was scheduled to be deported to Auschwitz. However, the camp commander was looking for musicians. His ability to play a one string cello combined with his mimical talents saved his life.

Bueno de Mesquita was one of the first television artists, starring on-screen as early as 1952, Bueno de Mesquita appeared on television as a comedian. In the 1960s, he produced shows with Rita Corita, both on television and in theaters. In 1968, he started working with Rudi Carrell on German television, which he continued doing for 13 seasons. Since his name was hard to pronounce for many Germans, he was known as "the small one with the moustache". He has stated that his success in making Germans laugh sometimes felt like a small revenge.

Beside working with Rita Corita and Rudi Carrell, he also worked a lot with The Mounties (Dutch comedians), both on television and the theaters.

He wrote an autobiography titled Cello met één snaar (Cello with one string).

After a long illness with lung cancer and a brain tumor, Bueno de Mesquita died on 18/19 August 2005 in his hometown of Lelystad at the age of 87.

== Literature ==
- Abraham Bueno de Mesquita: Cello met een snaar; mijn levensverhaal. Cadans, Amsterdam 1994, ISBN 90-513-2017-5.
