= Philipp Schmitt =

German officer of the Schutzstaffel (SS) (1902-1950)

Philipp Johann Adolf Schmitt (20 November 1902 – 8 August 1950) was a German officer of the Schutzstaffel (SS) who served as commandant of Fort Breendonk, a Nazi prison camp in German-occupied Belgium during World War II. For a year, he was also in charge of Mechelen transit camp but was dismissed for corruption and black marketeering. He later served in occupied Denmark and the Netherlands. After the war, he was convicted of war crimes and was executed in 1950. Schmitt was the last person executed in Belgium.

== Early life ==
Schmitt was born in Bad Kissingen, Bavaria, in 1902; after the First World War, Schmitt enlisted in a Bavarian Freikorps. He was a member of the Bund Oberland from 1922 to 1923 and from 1925 to 1930. He became a member of the NSDAP in 1925 but let his membership lapse in 1926. In September 1930 Schmitt renewed his party membership and in March 1932 he joined the Schutzstaffel (SS) (member nr. 44.291). He was promoted to SS-Untersturmführer in September 1935 and to SS-Obersturmführer in September 1936. In 1936 he was transferred to the SD. In April 1938 he was promoted to SS-Hauptsturmführer. Before the start of the Second World War Schmitt was transferred to Wiesbaden where he oversaw order during the road works of the Organisation Todt.

== World War II ==
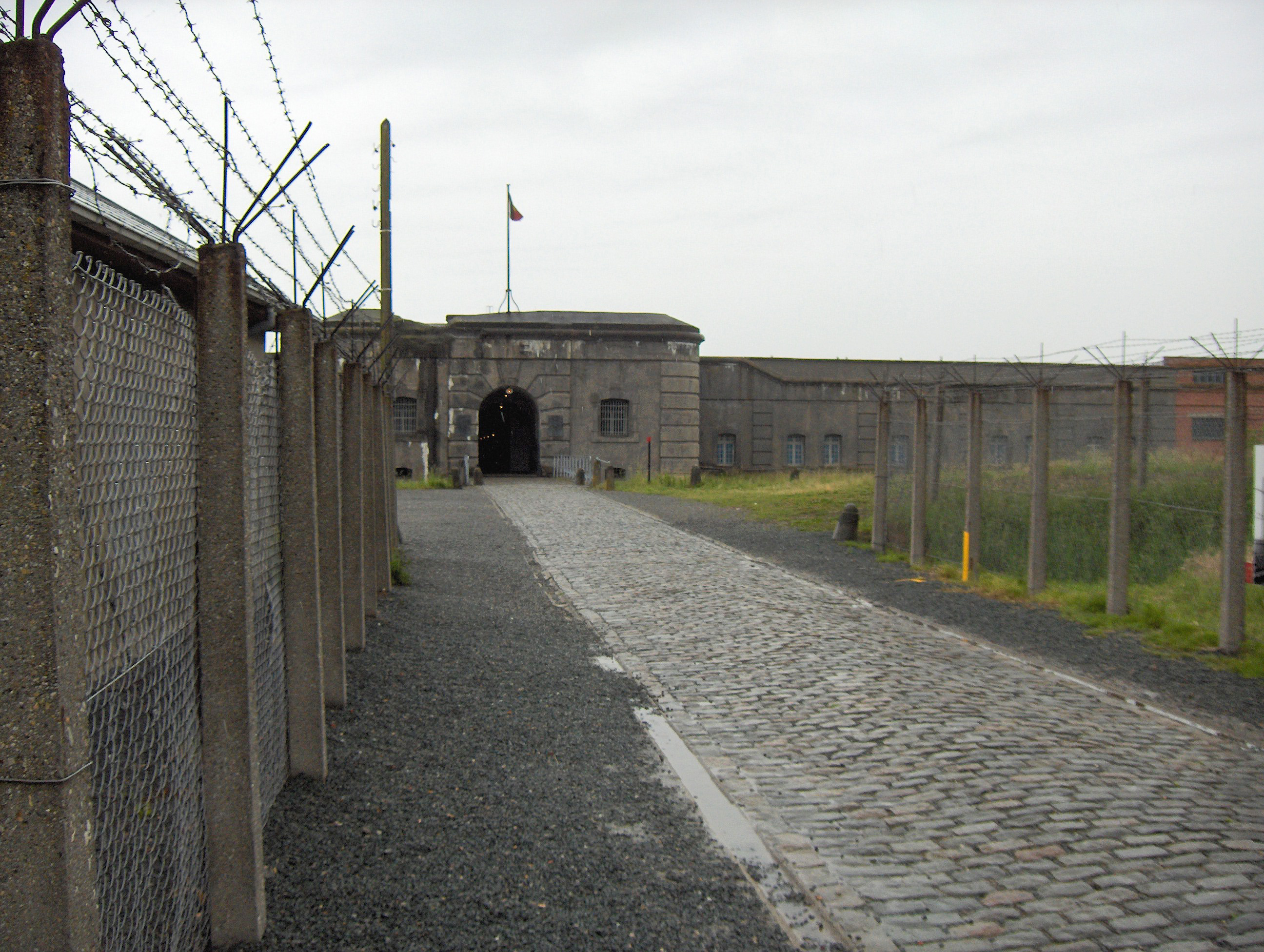
Fort Breendonk, the prison camp which Schmitt commanded, is now preserved as a museum

After the fall of Belgium, in August 1940 Schmitt was posted to Brussels as a SS-Sturmbannführer with the SD. He was given the task to establish a prison camp in the old Fort Breendonk. He served as camp commandant until November 1943. Schmitt was known for his ruthless attitude towards the prisoners. He was known for having his Alsatian dog, 'Lump', attack the prisoners. Besides being commandant of Breendonk in July 1942 Schmitt was also made commandant of the SS-Sammellager Mecheln, a detention and deportation camp established in the Dossin, the oldest barracks at Mechelen. From this camp over 25,000 people, mainly Jews, were deported to Auschwitz. In November 1943 Schmitt was fired as commandant as it became known that he had engaged in black market practices, for which he was formally reprimanded by Ernst Kaltenbrunner. He was replaced as commandant by Karl Schönwetter.

After recovering from an illness he was transferred to Denmark where he was part of the Aarhus division and involved in the murder of four Danish resistance members. Near the end of the war he was transferred to the Netherlands, where near Roermond he was wounded by American artillery fire in the leg.

== Capture, trial and execution ==
Philipp Schmitt was arrested in May 1945 in the Netherlands. In the prison of Rotterdam, Schmitt was recognized by a former inmate of Breendonk and in November 1945 he was handed over to the Belgian authorities and himself imprisoned in Breendonk.

Schmitt was tried in August 1949 for his role in the deaths of 83 inmates at Breendonk and the inhuman treatment of the prisoners in the facility. He never showed any remorse and denied all of the atrocities that occurred at Breendonk, claiming he was merely re-educating the inmates as ordered. Schmitt was sentenced to death on 25 November 1949. On 8 August 1950, Schmitt was executed by firing squad in Antwerp at 6 a.m. He was the last person to be executed in Belgium before the abolition of capital punishment in 1996.
