= Capital punishment in Belgium =

Europe holds the greatest concentration of abolitionist states (blue). Map current as of 2022 Abolished for all offences Abolished in practice Retains capital punishment

Capital punishment in Belgium was formally abolished on August 1, 1996, for all crimes, in both peacetime and wartime. The last execution for crimes committed in peacetime took place in July 1863, when in Ypres a farmer was executed for murder. The last execution for an ordinary crime took place on 26 March 1918 at Veurne Prison when Emile Ferfaille, a military officer found guilty of killing his pregnant girlfriend, was guillotined. This was the first execution to be carried out since 1863. The guillotine that was used had to be imported from France.

Between November 1944 and August 1950, 242 people were executed by firing squad for crimes committed during the Second World War. 241 of them had been convicted as collaborators. A total of 2,940 persons were sentenced to death in that period, but only 242 executions were carried out. The last person ever to be executed in Belgium was the German war criminal Philipp Schmitt on 8 August 1950, the camp commander of the concentration camp Fort Breendonk. Although the Belgian Penal Code stipulated that the death penalty had to be carried out by decapitation, the 242 persons executed after the Second World War were tried by a military court and so they were executed by firing squad.

The death penalty is abolished.

— Article 14bis of the Belgian Constitution

On 1 January 1999, the Sixth Protocol to the European Convention of Human Rights, forbidding the death penalty in all circumstances, came into force and Belgium has also signed the second optional protocol of the International Covenant on Civil and Political Rights. On 2 February 2005, the prohibition of the death penalty was also included in the Belgian Constitution by inserting an Article 14bis.
