= German occupation of Belgium =

The German occupation of Belgium may refer to:

- German occupation of Belgium during World War I (1914–18)
- German occupation of Belgium during World War II (1940–44)
