= Kazerne Dossin Memorial, Museum and Documentation Centre =

Museum in Mechelen, Belgium

Coordinates: 51.0341°N 4.4785°E

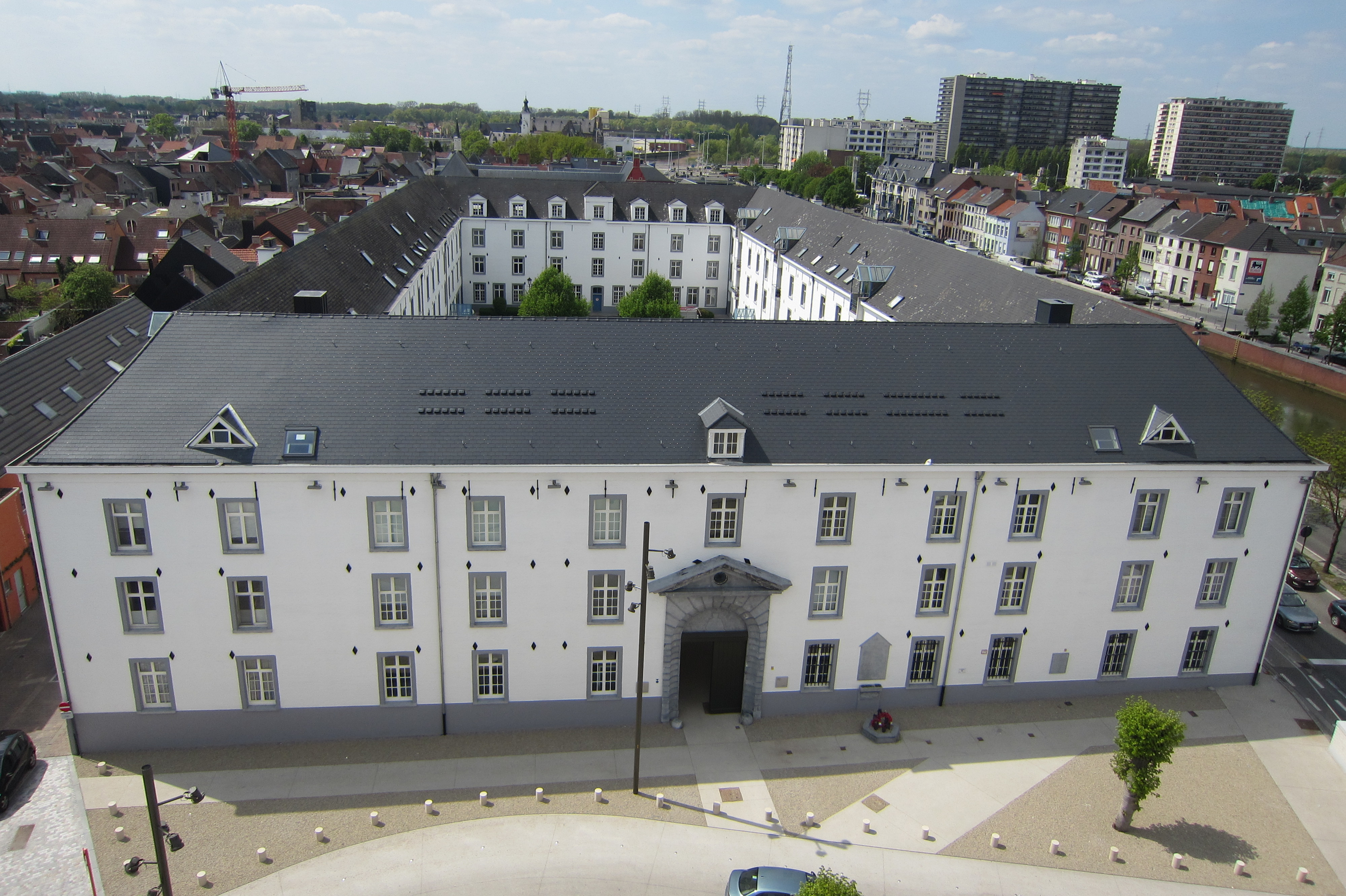
The original Dossin Barracks, site of the former transit camp, part of which at present houses the Kazerne Dossin Memorial

The Kazerne Dossin Holocaust memorial is the only part of the Kazerne Dossin: Memorial, Museum and Documentation Centre on Holocaust and Human Rights (Dutch: Kazerne Dossin - Memoriaal, museum en documentatiecentrum over Holocaust en Mensenrechten) established within the former Mechelen transit camp of World War II, from which, in German-occupied Belgium, arrested Jews and Romani were sent to concentration camps. The aforementioned museum and documentation centre are housed in a new purpose-built complex across the public square.

== History ==
Between July 1942 and September 1944, Kazerne Dossin (Dossin Barracks) was known as SS-Sammellager Mecheln, a Nazi collection and deportation camp. Here, 25,274 Jews and 354 Romani people were rounded up and transported to Auschwitz-Birkenau and other concentration camps in the east. Two thirds were killed upon arrival. By the time of the liberation and the end of the Holocaust in Belgium, only 1,395 of them had survived.

After the war, the former infantry barracks was partially renovated as civil housing; the Flemish Government, Province of Antwerp and the City of Mechelen financing the purchase of the ground floor and the basement of the right wing. In 1995 this building became the site of the Jewish Museum of Deportation and Resistance, later renamed.

== Museum ==
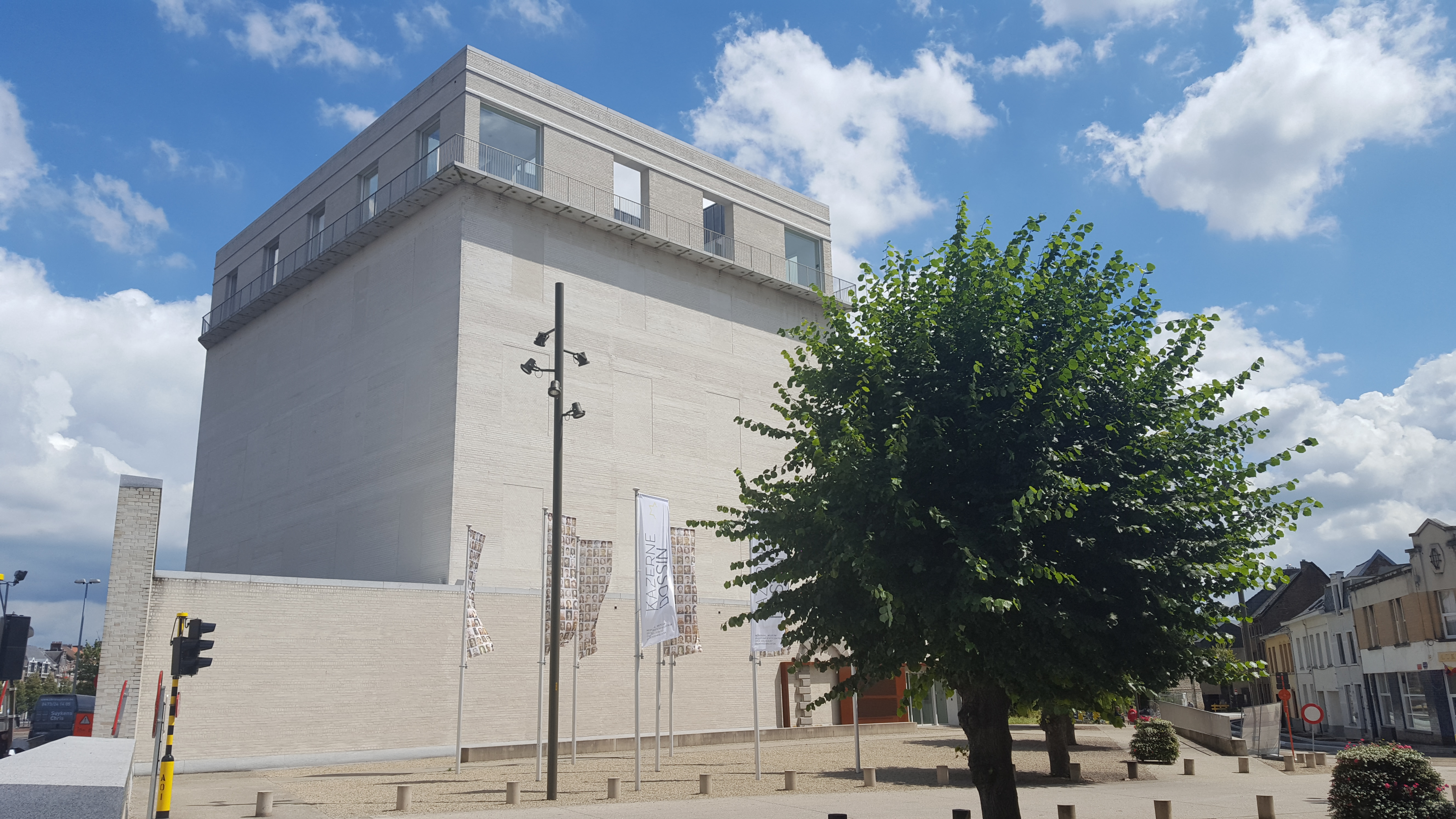
The new Kazerne Dossin museum and documentation centre building, seen from the former barracks opposite the square, in which historical complex the Holocaust memorial is situated

The Museum covered the following aspects of the Final Solution in Belgium and Europe:

- The rise of the extreme right in Belgium and abroad in the 1930s,
- The antisemitic policies imposed by occupying Germany,
- The Jewish resistance and hiding of children,
- The deportation of the Belgian Jews in convoys.

In 2001, the Flemish Government decided to expand the site by constructing a new museum complex opposite the old barracks. It opened its doors in September 2012 under its present name. Fort Breendonk, a Nazi prison camp near Mechelen, is also open as a museum.

== Criticism ==
In November 2019, general director Christoph Busch resigned because, in his view, the daily management was focused too much on the Holocaust memorial aspect and not enough on documenting current human rights violations. In March 2020, half of the 18 members of the scientific advisory council resigned after a December 2019 incident where the daily management abruptly cancelled a ceremony where Pax Christi would deliver its peace ambassadorship to Middle East expert Brigitte Herremans. The nine academics said Kazerne Dossin should not be a place to develop the current politics of Israel. Jewish groups had protested the award, claiming Herremans is a pro-Palestinian activist who supports sanctions against Israel and had claimed that pro-Israel activists "vastly inflate" antisemitism.

== See also ==
- List of Holocaust memorials and museums in Belgium
