= Mechelen transit camp =

Former Nazi transit camp and a current museum in Belgium

Mechelen transit camp SS-Sammellager Mecheln
- Transit camp
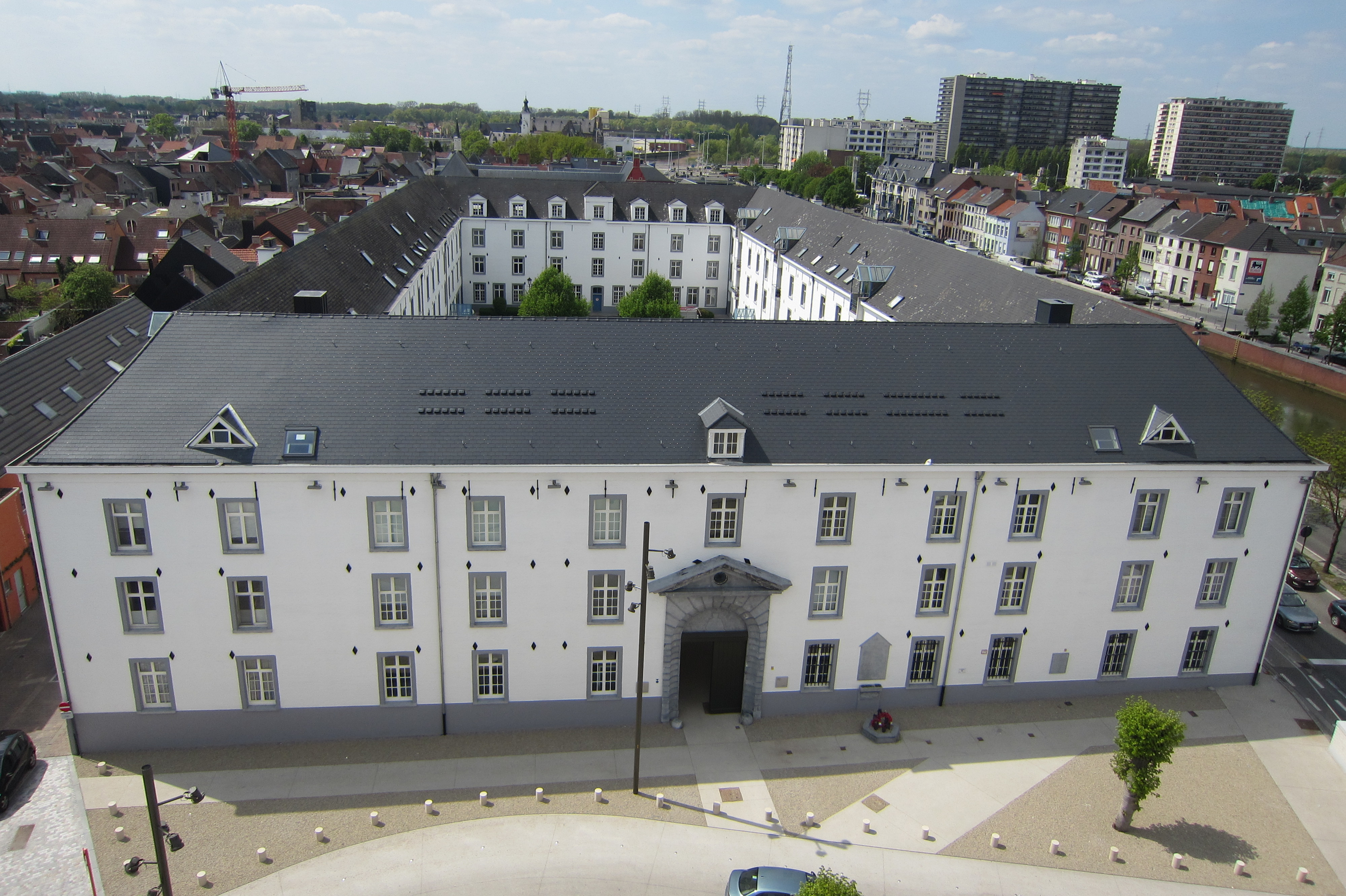
- Modern view of Dossin Barracks which housed the transit camp

- Location of the camp in Belgium
- Coordinates: 51°02′02″N 4°28′42″E
- Other names: SS-Sammellager Mecheln
- Location: Mechelen, Belgium
- Operated by: Nazi Germany: Sicherheitspolizei (Sipo-SD)
- Original use: Military barracks (Note: The Holy Roman Empress Maria Theresia of Austria, last of the House of Habsburg, ordered the building of the so-called Hof van Habsburg for an infantry regiment in 1756. Later it became a Belgian Army barracks.)
- First built: 1756
- Operational: July 1942 – September 1944
- Inmates: mainly Jews and Roma
- Number of inmates: Jews: 24,916; Roma: 351
- Killed: c.300 (on-site only)
- Liberated by: Allied Forces, 4 September 1944
- Notable inmates: Felix Nussbaum, Abraham Bueno de Mesquita
- Website: www.kazernedossin.eu/en

The Mechelen transit camp, officially SS-Sammellager Mecheln (lit. 'SS Assembly Camp Mechelen') in German, also known as the Dossin barracks, was a detention and deportation camp established in a former army barracks at Mechelen in German-occupied Belgium. It served as a point to gather Belgian Jews and Romani ahead of their deportation to concentration and extermination camps in Eastern Europe during the Holocaust.

The camp was established in March 1942 and was the only transit camp in Belgium. It was managed by the Sicherheitspolizei (SiPo-SD), a branch of the Reich Security Main Office, and was used to hold Jews and Romani ahead of their deportation to Auschwitz-Birkenau as well as other camps including Heydebreck-Cosel. Between 4 August 1942 and 31 July 1944, 28 trains left from near the camp and deported over 25,800 people. Only 1,240 survived the war.

The camp was abandoned at the Liberation of Belgium in September 1944 and subsequently was repurposed for housing. A museum was established in 1996 and today part of the former barracks and a new building opposite form part of the Kazerne Dossin – Memorial, Museum and Documentation Centre on Holocaust and Human Rights, which includes a Holocaust memorial and museum.

== Background ==
=== German occupation and persecution ===
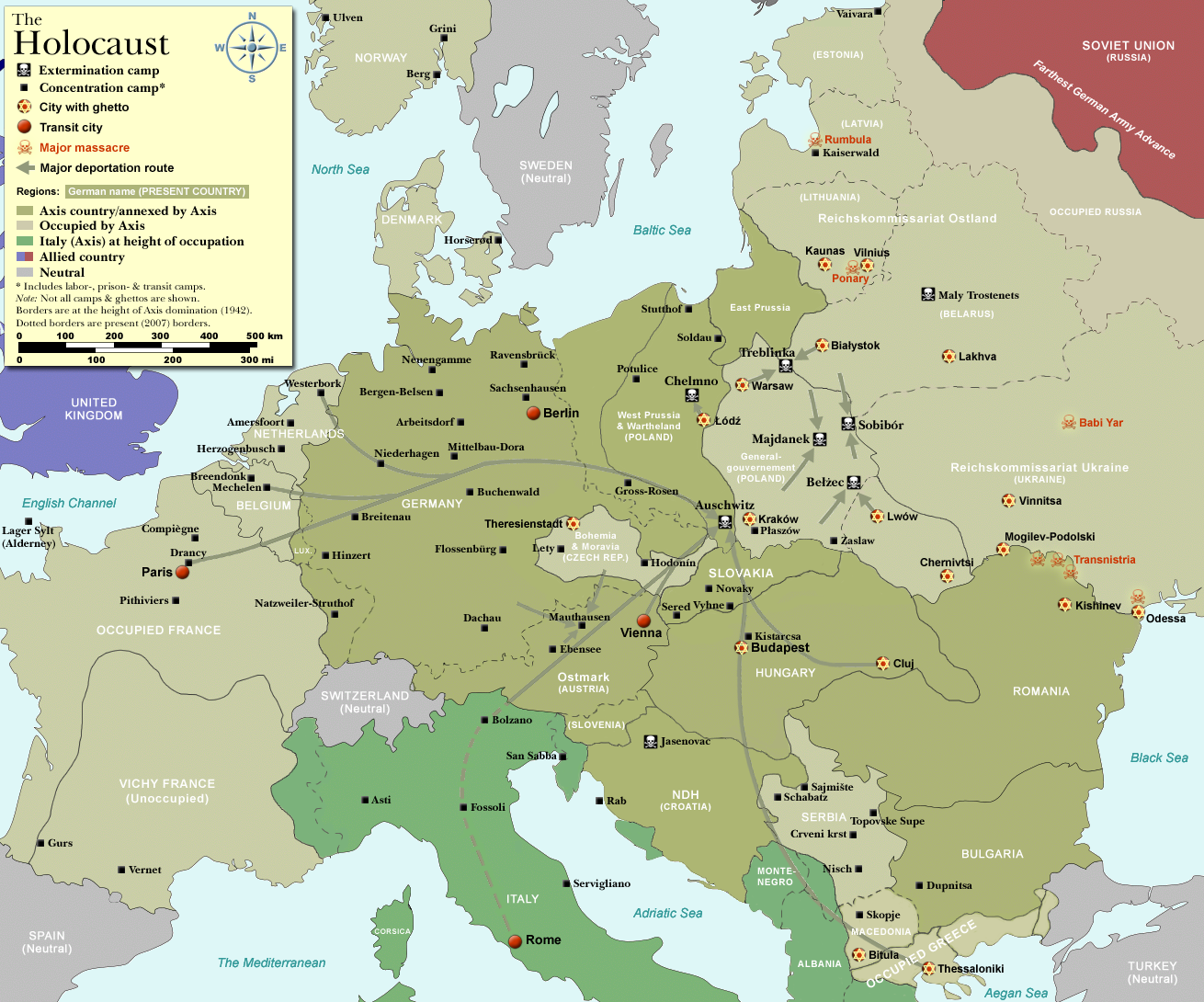
Map of the Holocaust: this map shows all concentration and extermination camps in German-occupied Europe as well as labor camps, prison camps, ghettos, major deportation routes and major massacre sites

Belgium was invaded by Nazi Germany in a rapid military campaign on 10–28 May 1940. It was subsequently placed under a military occupation administration which would endure until July 1944 when the territory briefly passed under a civilian administration, brought to an end by the Liberation of Belgium in September 1944.

As early as September 1940, the German administration established a prison camp in Fort Breendonk, a former Belgian military fort. Inmates were largely political prisoners, though a number of Jews were also held in a segregated part of the camp. As part of the Final Solution after January 1942, it was decided to transport Belgian Jews to concentration and extermination camps in Eastern Europe.

=== Mechelen transit camp ===
Approximately 90 percent of Belgium's Jewish population lived in the cities of Antwerp and Brussels in 1942. Accordingly, Mechelen, a city with a railway hub located halfway between the two, was chosen as the site of the new transit camp.

The building chosen to house the camp was a former army facility called Dossin Barracks, built in 1756 and named after Lieutenant-General Émile Dossin de Saint-Georges, a hero of the Battle of the Yser during World War I. It was located in the north of the city and provided access to the railway freight dock serving the River Dyle. The three-storey block that completely surrounded a large square yard was fitted with barbed wire. It became operational in July 1942.

== Operation ==
The camp staff was mostly German but was assisted by Belgian collaborationist paramilitaries from the Algemeene-SS Vlaanderen ("General SS Flanders"). It was officially under the command of Philipp Schmitt, commandant of the Fort Breendonk. The acting commandant at Mechelen was SS officer Rudolph Steckmann.

The first group of people arrived in the camp from Antwerp on 27 July 1942. Between August and December 1942, two transports, each with about 1,000 Jews, left the camp every week for Auschwitz concentration camp. Between 4 August 1942 and 31 July 1944, a total of 28 trains left Mechelen for German-occupied Poland, carrying 24,916 Jews and 351 Roma; most of them went to Auschwitz. This figure represented more than half of the Belgian Jews murdered during the Holocaust. In line with the Nazi racial policy that much later became named the Romani genocide, 351 Belgian Roma were sent to Auschwitz in early 1944.

Conditions at the Mechelen camp were especially brutal. Many Roma were locked in basement rooms for weeks or months at a time without food or sanitary facilities. The Roma had an especially low survival rate.

Summer 1942: the Mechelen transit camp after the arrival of those caught during the night.

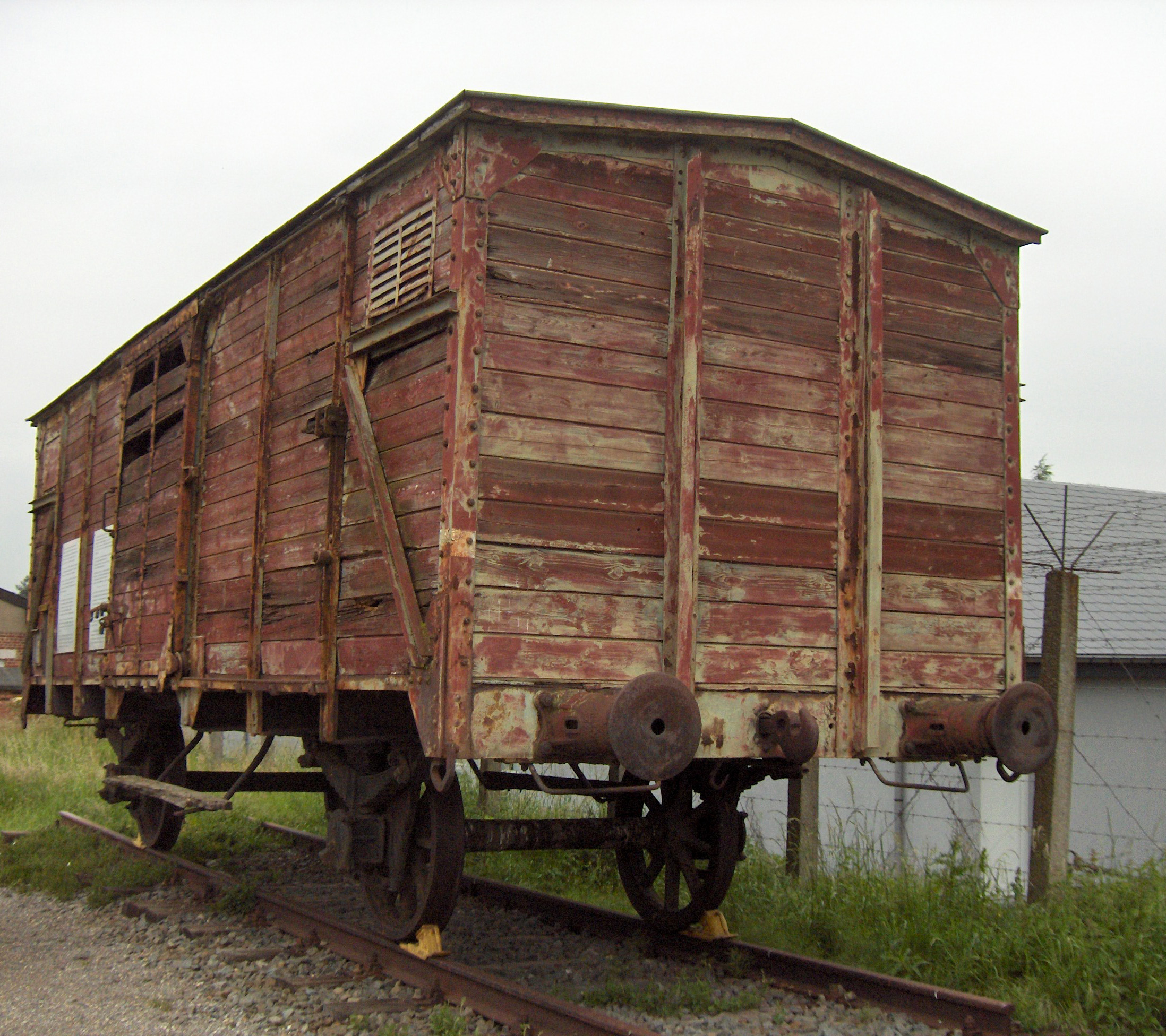
Original boxcar used for transport to concentration camps in the collection of Fort Breendonk

Transports from Mechelen to Auschwitz-Birkenau Deported people per age (above and below 15 years old) and gender. All deportees were Jews with the exception of those on Transport Z.
Transports	Date	Men	Boys	Women	Girls	Total
Transport 1	4 August 1942	544	28	403	23	998
Transport 2	11 August 1942	459	25	489	26	999
Transport 3	15 June 1942	380	48	522	50	1000
Transport 4	18 August 1942	339	133	415	112	999
Transport 5	25 August 1942	397	88	429	81	995
Transport 6	29 August 1942	355	60	531	54	1000
Transport 7	1 September 1942	282	163	401	154	1000
Transport 8	10 September 1942	388	111	403	98	1000
Transport 9	12 September 1942	408	91	401	100	1000
Transport 10	15 September 1942	405	132	414	97	1048
Transport 11	26 September 1942	562	231	713	236	1742
Transport 12	10 October 1942	310	135	423	131	999
Transport 13	10 October 1942	228	89	259	99	675
Transport 14	24 October 1942	324	112	438	121	995
Transport 15	24 October 1942	314	30	93	39	476
Transport 16	31 October 1942	686	16	94	27	823
Transport 17	31 October 1942	629	45	169	32	875
Transport 18	15 January 1943	353	105	424	65	947
Transport 19	15 January 1943	239	51	270	52	612
Transport 20	19 April 1943	463	115	699	127	1404
Transport 21	31 July 1943	672	103	707	71	1553
Transport 22a	20 September 1943	291	39	265	36	631
Transport 22b	20 September 1943	305	74	351	64	794
Transport 23	15 January 1944	307	33	293	22	655
Transport Z (Note: Z stands for Zigeuner, or Roma in German)	15 January 1944	85	91	101	74	351
Transport 24	4 April 1944	303	29	275	18	625
Transport 25	19 May 1944	237	20	230	21	508
Transport 26	31 July 1944	280	15	251	17	563
Total	August 1942 – July 1944	10,545	2,212	10,463	2,047	25,267

== Confrontation ==
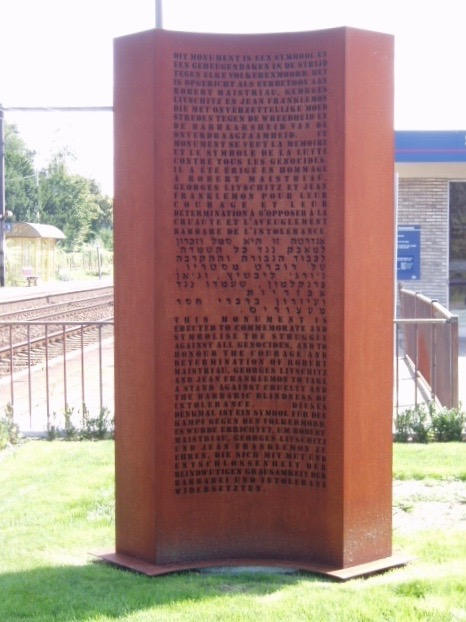
Monument to the resistance action against the 20th Belgian Jew transport in the railway station of Boortmeerbeek, Belgium.

Some people succeeded in escaping the transports, especially from the Transports 16 and 17 which consisted of men returned from forced labor on the Atlantic Wall to Belgium. Most of these men jumped between Mechelen and the German border. Many were caught and were soon put on subsequent transports but a total of about 500 Jewish prisoners did manage to escape across all the 28 transports. On 19 April 1943 three resistance fighters, acting on their own initiative, stopped Transport 20 near the train station of Boortmeerbeek, 10 kilometres (6.2 mi) south-east of Mechelen. From this action 17 prisoners managed to flee. More Jews escaped by their own deeds, a total of 231 Jews fled although 90 were eventually recaptured and 26 were shot by guards escorting the train.

The last transport left on 31 July 1944 but Allied forces could not stop it before its destination was reached. As Belgium was being liberated, an attempt by the Germans to deport 1,600 political prisoners and Allied prisoners of war from Brussels to concentration camps in Germany via the Nazi ghost train was thwarted by Belgian railway workers and the Belgian resistance. The train made it to Mechelen but returned to Brussels where the release of the prisoners was negotiated by Swiss and Swedish diplomats. When the Allies approached Mechelen by 3 September 1944, the Germans fled the Dossin Barracks, leaving the 527 remaining prisoners behind. Some remaining prisoners escaped that night and the others were freed on the 4th, though soon replaced with suspected collaborators. The lists of deportees were left at Hasselt during the German retreat and were later discovered intact.

== Memorial and Museum ==
In 1948 Dossin Barracks reverted to its original use by the Belgian Army. It was used until 1975 when it was abandoned. Apart from a wing renovated in the 1980s for social housing, the barracks became the site of the Jewish Museum of Deportation and Resistance by 1996. In 2001, the Flemish Government decided to expand the institution by a new complex built opposite the old barracks; the latter closed in July 2011, to become a memorial monument. The Kazerne Dossin – Memorial, Museum and Documentation Centre on Holocaust and Human Rights reopened its doors on 26 November 2012.

== See also ==
- The Holocaust in Belgium
- Belgium in World War II
