= Fort Breendonk =

Military fort which served as a Nazi prison camp in Willebroek, Belgium

Fort Breendonk SS-Auffanglager Breendonk
- Prison camp
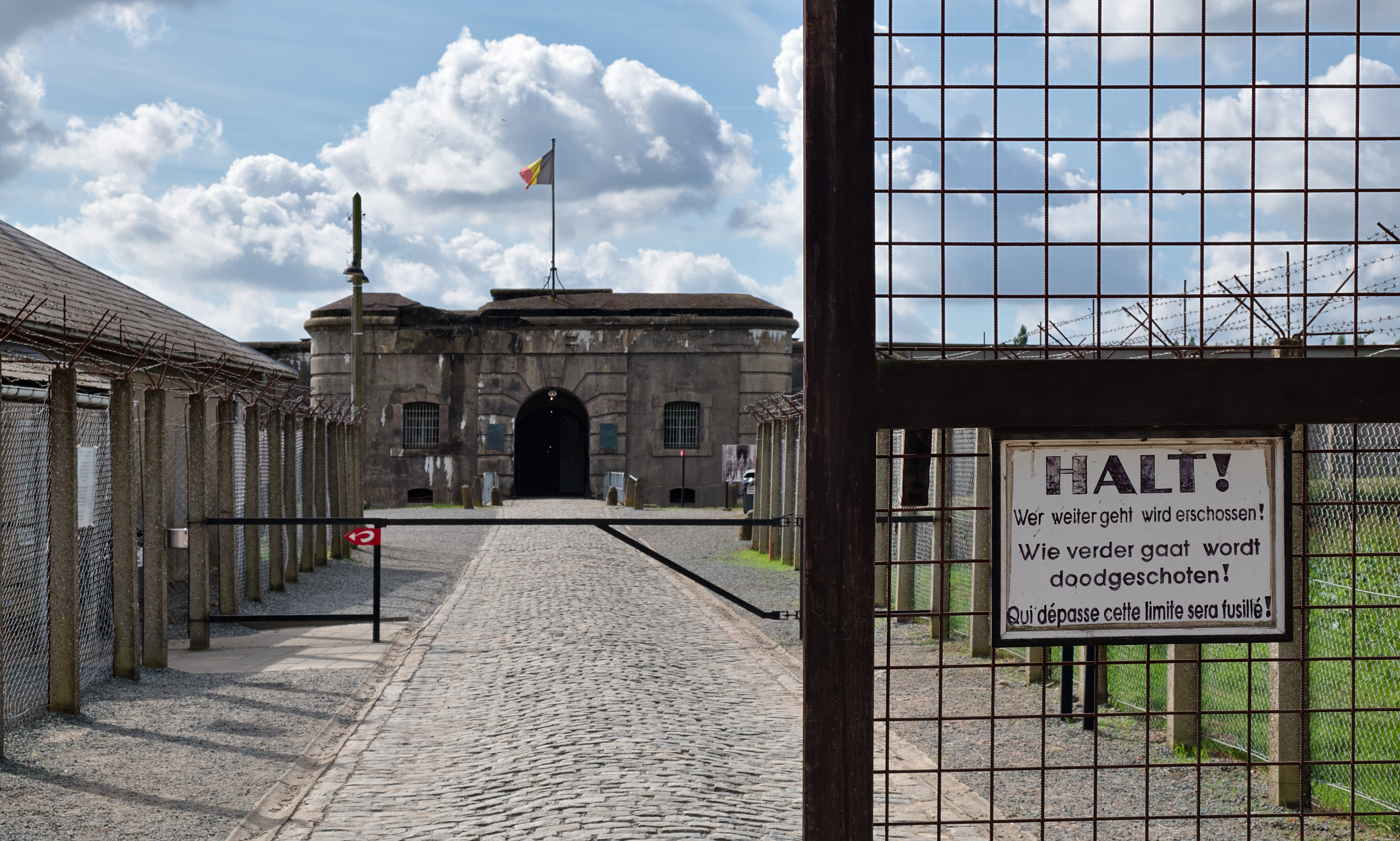
- A modern view of the camp's entrance

- Location of the camp in Belgium
- Coordinates: 51°03′23″N 04°20′29″E
- Other names: SS-Auffanglager Breendonk
- Location: Breendonk, Province of Antwerp, Belgium
- Built by: Belgian Army (part of the National Redoubt of Antwerp)
- Operated by: SS
- Commandant: Philipp Schmitt (August 1940–November 1943); Karl Schönwetter (November 1943–August 1944)
- First built: 1906–13
- Operational: 20 September 1940 – 4 September 1944
- Inmates: Jews, political prisoners, resistance members, hostages
- Notable inmates: Jean Améry, Willy Kruyt, Martial van Schelle, Todor Angelov, Paul Hoornaert
- Website: www.breendonk.be

Fort Breendonk (Dutch: Fort van Breendonk, French: Fort de Breendonk) is a former military installation at Breendonk, near Mechelen, Belgium, which served as a Nazi prison camp (Auffanglager) during the German occupation of Belgium during World War II.

Originally constructed between 1906 and 1913 as part of the second ring of the National Redoubt defending Antwerp, Fort Breendonk was used by the Belgian Army and was covered by a five-metre thick layer of soil for defense against artillery fire, a water-filled moat and measured 656 by 984 feet (200 by 300 m). It was used in both World War I and World War II, by which time it had become militarily obsolete.

Fort Breendonk was requisitioned by the Schutzstaffel (SS) shortly after the Belgian surrender on 28 May 1940; it was used as a prison camp for the detention of political prisoners, resistance members, and Jews. Although technically a prison rather than a concentration camp, it became infamous for the poor living conditions in which the prisoners were housed and for the torture and executions which were carried out there. Most detainees were subsequently transferred to larger concentration camps in Eastern Europe. 3,590 prisoners are known to have been held at Fort Breendonk during the war, of whom 303 died or were executed in the fort itself while 1,741 others subsequently died in other camps before the end of the war. In Belgian historical memory, Breendonk became symbolic of the barbarity of the German occupation.

The camp was evacuated ahead of the Liberation of Belgium by the Allies of World War II in September 1944. It was briefly repurposed to detain Belgian collaborators. It was declared a "national memorial" in 1947 and has subsequently been open to the public as a museum. Many of the camp's personnel were subsequently tried in Belgian courts for their wartime actions.

== Construction and military use ==
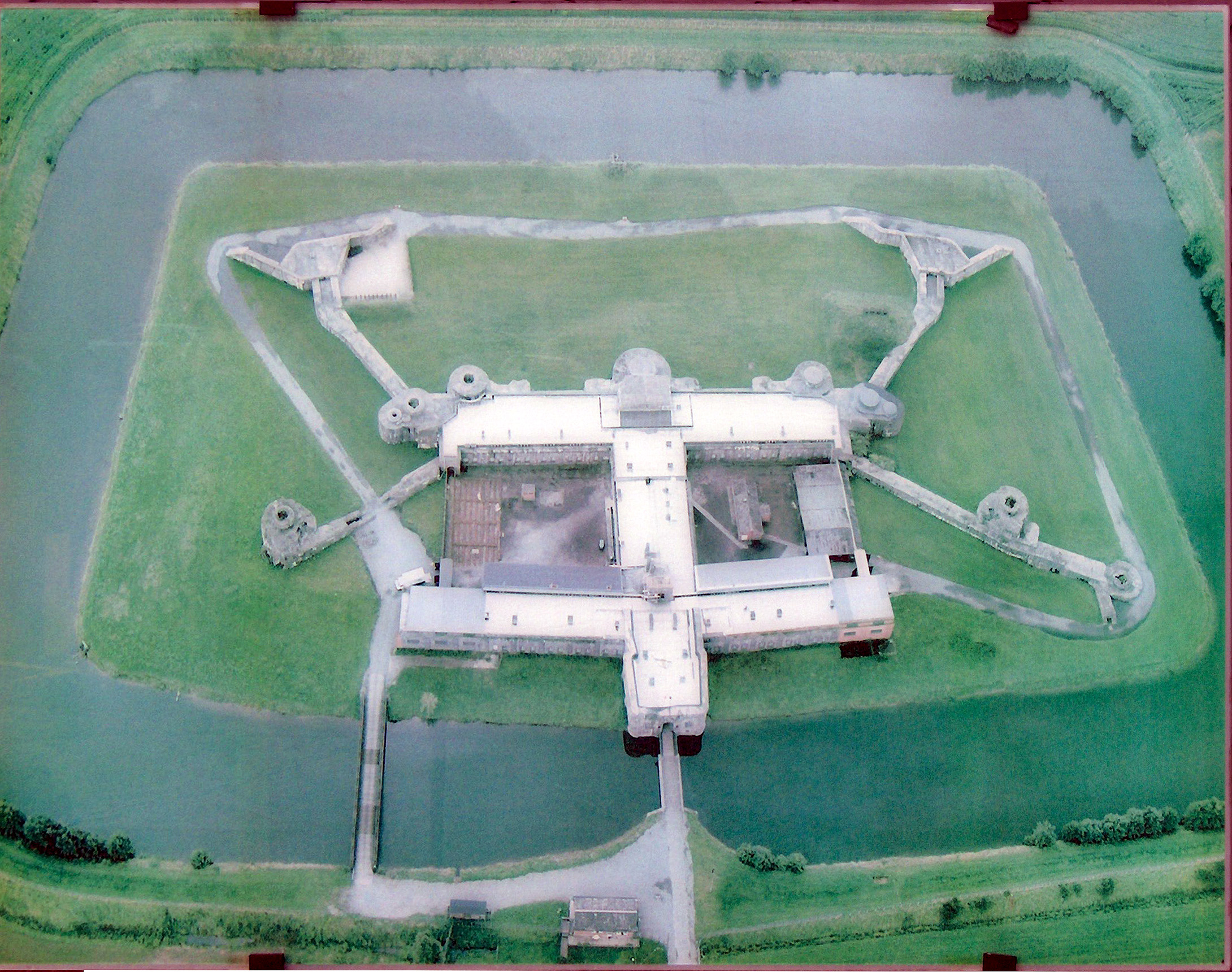
Modern aerial photograph of Fort Breendonk, from the north. The earth which originally covered the Fort's structure was removed by the prisoners under German supervision

Fort Breendonk was originally built by the Belgian Army in 1906–13 as part of the second ring of defenses of the National Redoubt protecting the important port-city of Antwerp. It was covered by a five-metre thick layer of soil for defense against bombings, a water-filled moat and measured 656 by 984 feet (200 by 300 m). It saw military service after the German invasion of Belgium in World War I. The siege of Antwerp begun in September 1914 and Breendonk came under fire from German howitzers out of range of its own guns on 1 October. However, the Germans successfully breached the Belgian line at Lier and were able to capture the city without making an assault on Breendonk. The fort's garrison surrendered on 9 October 1914. Breendonk was used briefly in World War II but was already militarily obsolete. During the German invasion of Belgium in May 1940, it served as the initial headquarters of the Belgian General Staff under King Leopold III but was abandoned as the Germans advanced. The Belgian Army surrendered on 28 May 1940, beginning a period of German occupation which lasted until September 1944.

== German prison camp: Breendonk I ==
Breendonk was occupied during the campaign of May 1940 and soon transformed into a prison camp which was controlled by SS and other security agencies of Nazi Germany—Sicherheitspolizei (SIPO) and Sicherheitsdienst (SD) in particular—although Belgium itself was under military (Wehrmacht) jurisdiction and controlled by General Alexander von Falkenhausen.

=== Administration and inmates ===
On 20 September 1940, the first prisoners arrived. Initially most of the prisoners were petty criminals, people deemed anti-social, or who did not conform to the German race laws. Later on, resistance fighters, political prisoners and ordinary people captured as hostages were detained as well. Another section was used as a transit camp for Jews being sent to death camps in Eastern Europe such as Auschwitz-Birkenau.

The camp was guarded by Flemish collaborationist paramilitaries as well as German SS units. Of the 300 prisoners who died in the camp itself, 185 were executed; many of the rest died of torture, disease or exposure. Most of those who did survive were transported to concentration camps, where many died. The German execution poles and gallows, as well as the torture chamber, are preserved in the current museum on the site of the fort

Between 3,500 and 3,600 prisoners were incarcerated in Breendonk during its existence, of whom 1,733 died before liberation. About 400-500 were Jews. Most of the non-Jewish prisoners were left-wing members of the Belgian resistance or were held as hostages by the Germans. In September 1941, the Belgian Communist prisoners held at Breendonk were deported to Neuengamme concentration camp.

Jewish prisoners in Breendonk were segregated from other prisoners until 1942. Thereafter, Jews were transferred to the nearby Mechelen transit camp and deported to the Auschwitz-Birkenau extermination camp in Nazi-occupied Poland.

=== Daily life in the camp ===
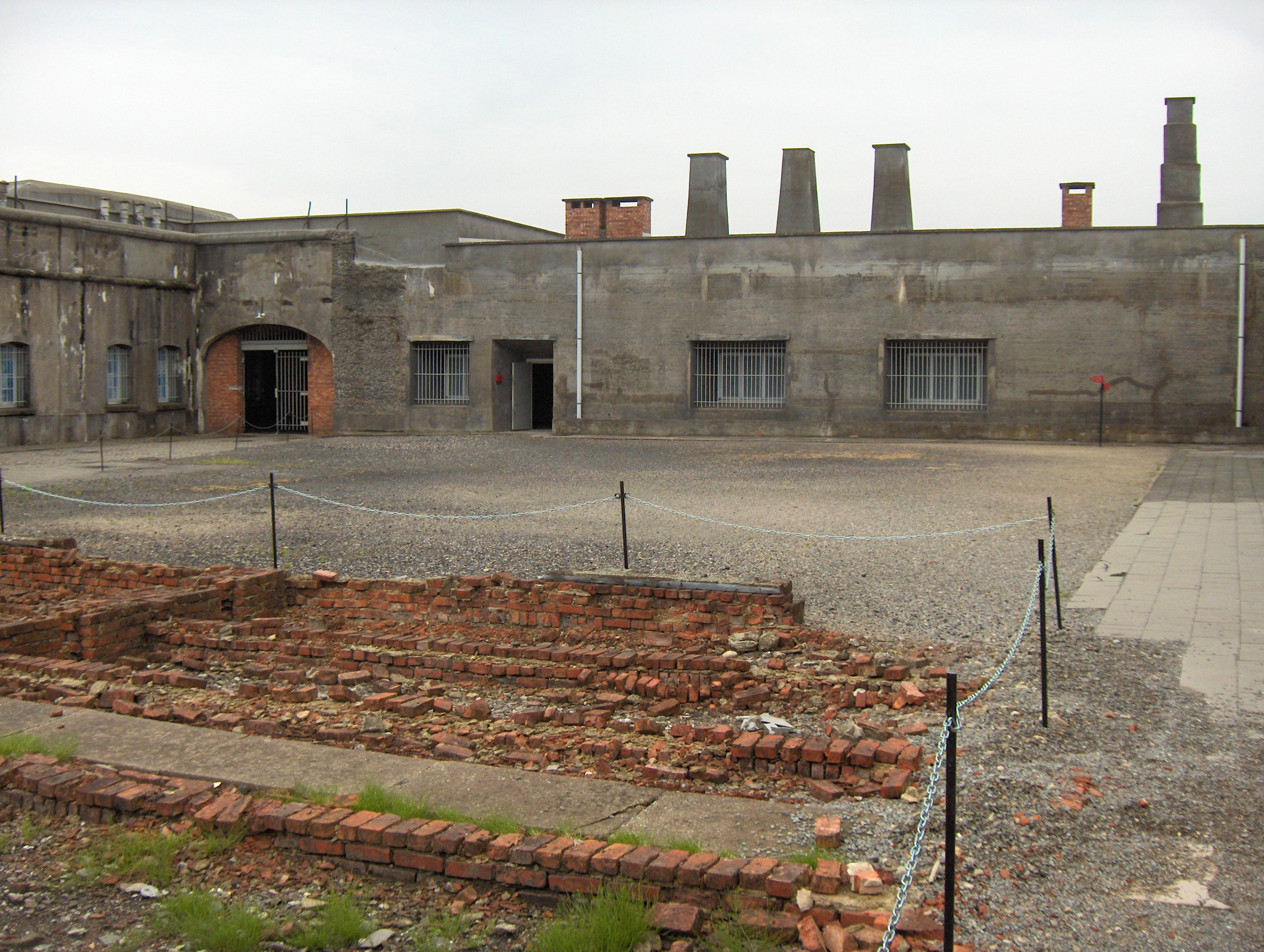
View of Breendonk's courtyard where roll-calls were held

Upon arrival at the camp, new inmates were brought to the courtyard where they would have to stand facing the wall until they were processed into the camp. They were forbidden to move and any motion was severely punished. In the camp, punishment consisted of beatings, torture in the old gunpowder magazine, hanging or execution by firing squad. Inmates were forced to watch any executions that took place. The camp commander Lagerkommandant Philipp Schmitt was known to set his German Shepherd dog (called "Lump") loose on the inmates. His wife was also known to wander the camp, ridiculing the inmates and ordering punishments at whim. Severe and arbitrary beating occurred daily.

During winter 1942–1943, after the German defeat at Stalingrad, more than once inmates, mostly Jewish, were forced by the Flemish SS guards to enter into the extremely cold water of the moat, where they forced to stay by the guards wielding shovels. The victims gradually sank or fell into the mud and most of them, after a struggle that could last for more than 15 minutes, finally drowned.

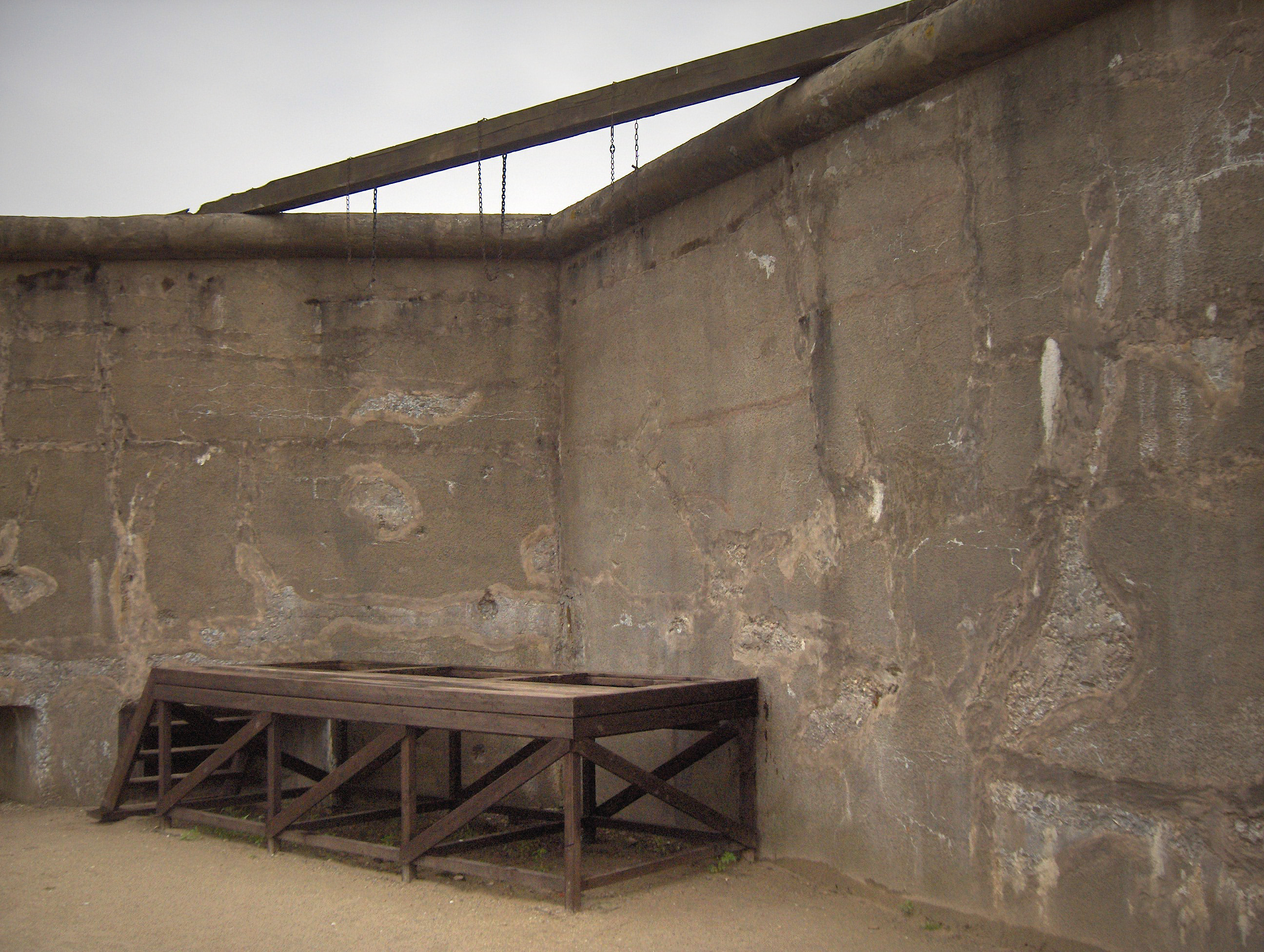
The prison's gallows, built by the Germans, are preserved in the current museum

All the prisoners were subjected to forced labour. The camp authorities wanted the earth that had covered much of the Fort to be removed and shifted to build a high bank around the camp to hide it from outside view. In the few years Fort Breendonk was used by the Nazis, 250,000 cubic metres (8,800,000 cu ft) of soil covering the fort were removed by the prisoners by hand at a gruelling pace. Prisoners had only hand tools to complete this enormous task and the soil had to be transported to the outer wall via hand carts on a narrow gauge railway system. The ground in the camp was often very soggy, causing the rails to sink away into the mud. Prisoners were expected to move by hand the carts filled with dirt, pushing and dragging them back and forth over a distance of more than 300 meters. This regime was imposed for over 12 hours a day, seven days a week, even in the worst of weather conditions. Orders were given only in German, so inmates were forced to learn the basic commands rather quickly or otherwise be punished for failure to obey orders. Prisoners were also forced to salute and stand to attention every time a guard passed.

Accommodation in the fort consisted of the old barracks. Built from thick stone, without windows and with only minimal ventilation, these were extremely cold and damp. Each barrack room had only a small coal burning stove, and providing sufficient heating was nearly impossible. Rooms were originally designed for no more than 38 people, but frequently housed more than 50 inmates sleeping in three-tier bunk beds on straw mattresses. The top bunks were highly prized. A single small bucket per room was provided for a toilet during the night. Many of the sick and weakened inmates simply allowed their waste to drop down to the lower levels. This caused much fighting between inmates, which was probably what the guards wanted.

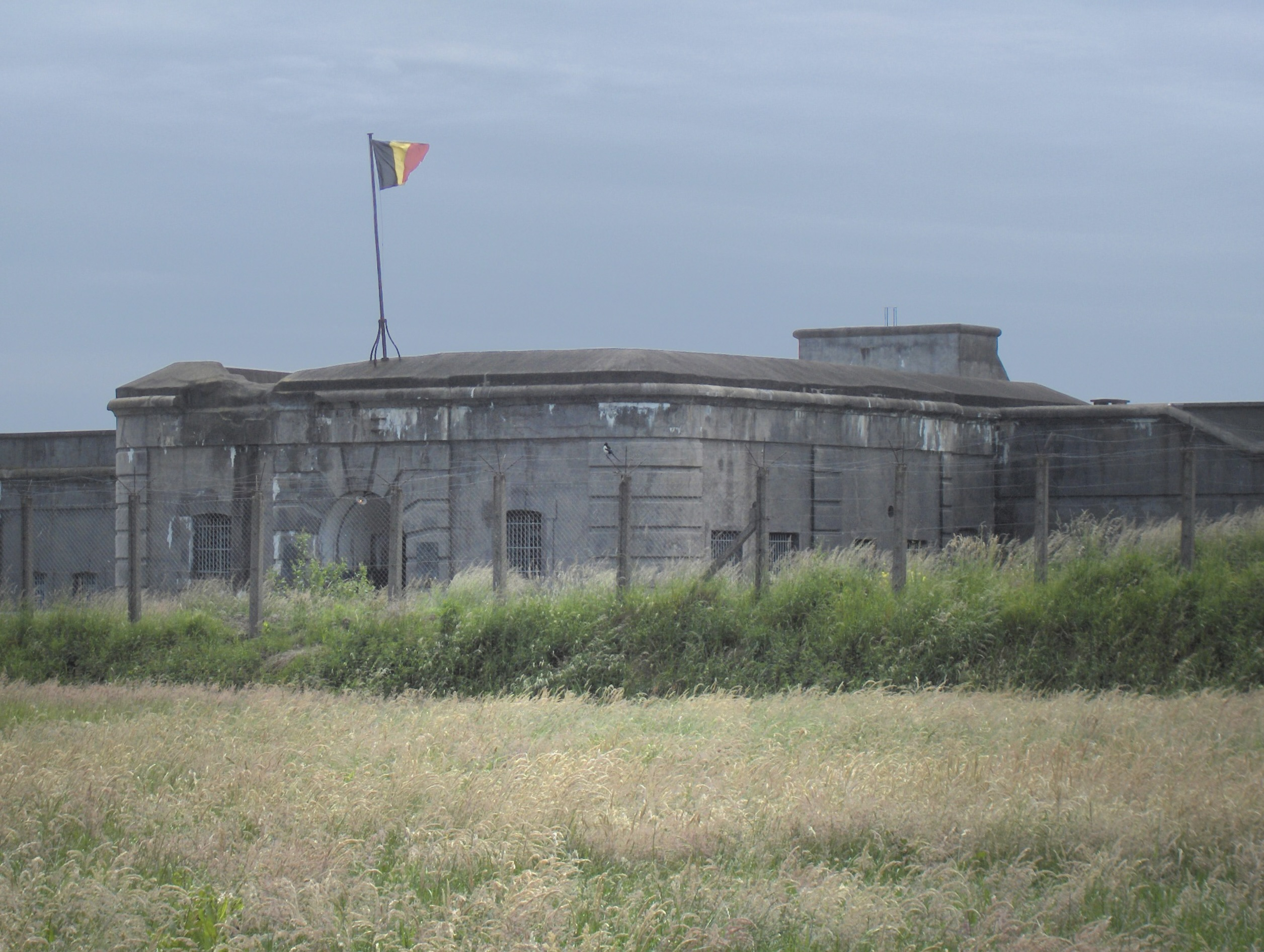
View of the Fort's entrance

Prisoners were allowed to use the toilet in the given order only twice a day. There were two gathering spaces inside the fort, east and west, each one with a small building, made of brick and without doors, equipped with four holes and one urinal. Only in 1944 was a larger facility added. But to go to the toilet was always done under surveillance, in group and in a hurry: the guards used these periods as additional opportunities to intimidate and humiliate the prisoners.

Jewish prisoners were segregated from other inmates and housed in specially constructed wooden barracks. These barracks were poorly insulated and over-crowded. Other prisoners were housed in cells, either in small groups or individually. The aim was to isolate certain prisoners for later interrogation and torture.

Food was severely rationed for the prisoners and distributed in different quantities to the various types of inmates. Jews received the least food and water. Prisoners were served three meals a day. Breakfast consisted of two cups of a coffee substitute made of roasted acorns and 125 grams (4.4 oz) of bread. Lunch was usually one litre of soup (mostly just hot water). Supper was again two cups of a coffee substitute and 100 grams (3.5 oz) of bread. This was far from enough to sustain a human being, especially considering the intense cold or heat, harsh labour and physical punishments the prisoners were subjected to.

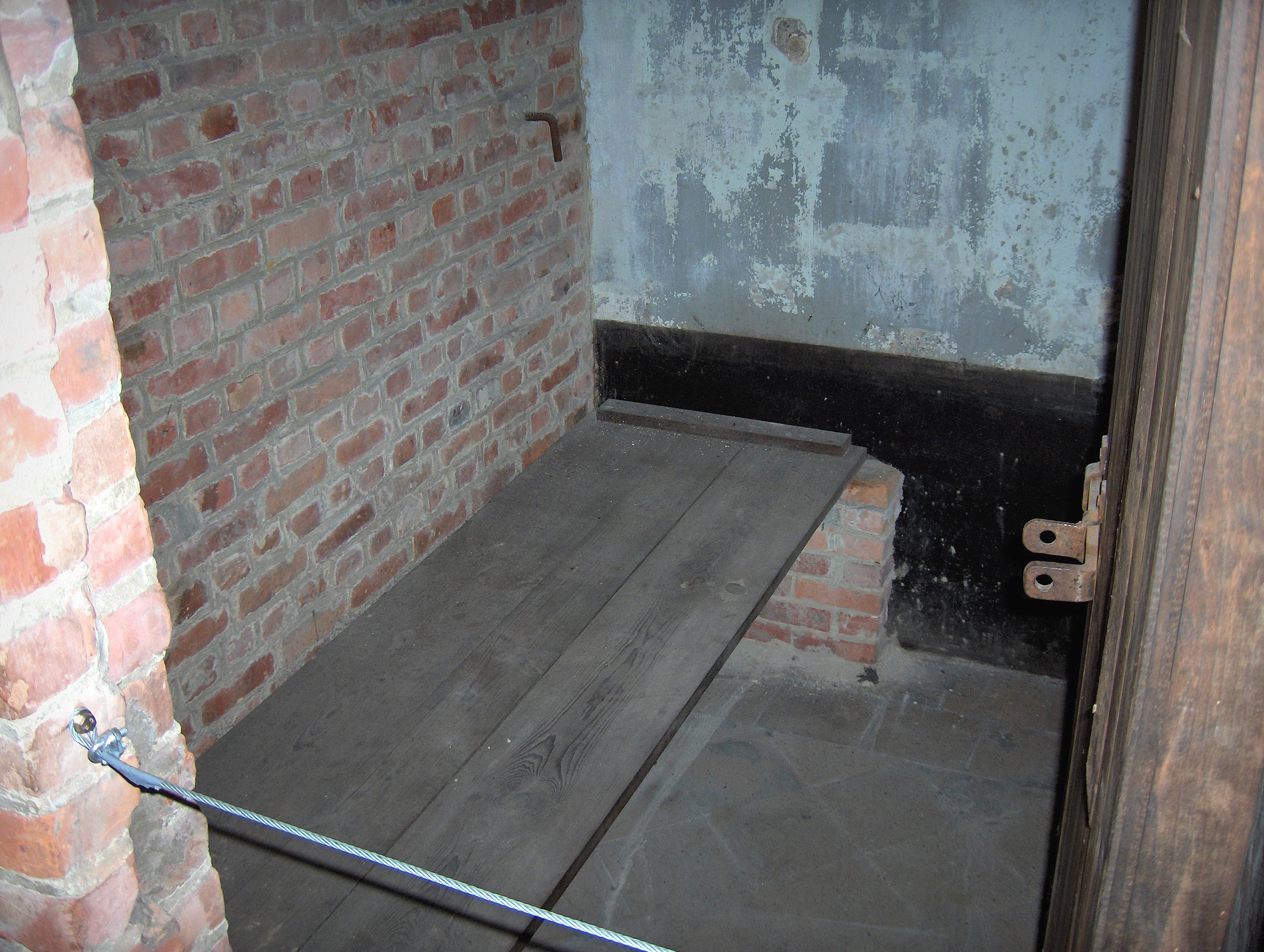
View of an interrogation cell

This harsh treatment of prisoners started to leak outside the Fort to such a degree that the head of the administrative staff of the Military Governor of Belgium Eggert Reeder was compelled to order an inspection of the Fort because Von Falkenhausen "did not want the camp to become known to history as the hell of Breendonk". But the respite was short lived also because the SS seized and forwarded to Germany most of the food parcels sent in by the Red Cross.

Conditions in the camp were so cruel and harsh that those who left alive were so weak that their chances of survival at the final destination were severely hampered. Often prisoners were so sick and weak that they were led straight to the gas chambers or simply died within weeks of their arrival. The regime in the camp was at least as harsh as in an actual concentration camp. On 4 September 1944 the SS evacuated the Fort, and all the remaining prisoners were sent to Buchenwald concentration camp. Fewer than 10 percent of the inmates survived the war.

Particular controversy surrounds the Flemish SS guards of the camp, who so openly and cruelly turned against their fellow countrymen in support of their Nazi paymasters. The memoirs of Charles Arnold-Baker, who was the British officer responsible for taking over the camp from the remaining staff, makes reference to this event.

=== Notable inmates ===
Famed author, philosopher, and journalist Jean Améry (formerly Hans Mayer) was captured by the Nazis in July 1943 while fighting with Belgian Resistance. He was subsequently sent to Fort Breendonk, where he was severely tortured before being sent to Auschwitz. Améry discussed his experiences in a book he wrote about the dehumanization that occurred between victim and perpetrator during the Holocaust, a work he entitled At the Mind's Limits.

Comics artist Marc Sleen also spent time in Breendonk, together with his brother, because his third brother was a member of the resistance. The Nazis hoped to hear from them about the whereabouts of their brother, but they never betrayed him. As a consequence Sleen, his brother and other prisoners were put in a death cell, where one of them was shot every day. By the time it was Sleen's turn he was lucky that D-Day had occurred, causing a mass panic among the prison guards. They took every prisoner with them to another camp, where Sleen was able to escape. Yet he would suffer post-traumatic nightmares about these experiences for the rest of his life.

The artist Jacques Ochs was interned in Breendonk from 1940 to 1942, when he managed to escape. A few of the drawings he made during his time there had survived. He used them after the war to reconstruct scenes of life in the camp, and in 1947 published those in the book Breendonck – Bagnards et Bourreaux ("Breendonck – Slave Laborers and Hangmen").

== Allied prison: Breendonk II ==
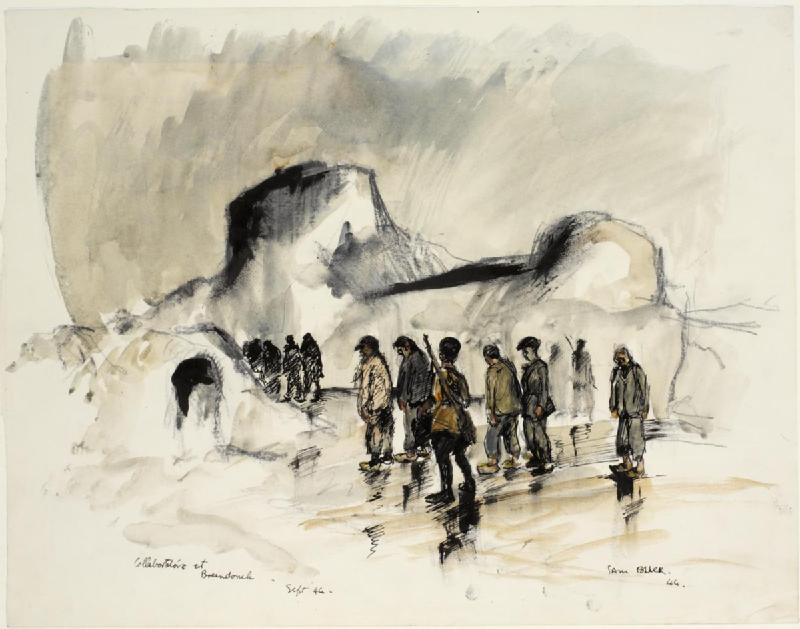
Belgian collaborators under guard at Breendonk after the liberation

The officer of the British Army designated to liberate the camp late in 1944 was Charles Arnold-Baker, a German and officer in MI6. After VE Day, Eileen Younghusband, a WAAF officer and fluent French-speaker, acted as a guide to RAF personnel visiting the camp. She had been in Germany prior to the start of the war, and had encountered fleeing Jews. During the German bombing of Britain, she had been a radar filter officer giving warning of air raids. When the German V-2 ballistic missile attacks on London and elsewhere began in 1944, she was sent to Belgium with mathematicians to help locate V-2 launch sites.

Fort Breendonk was briefly repurposed as an internment camp for Belgian collaborators. This period of the Fort's existence is known as "Breendonk II". The internees were moved to Dossin Barracks, Mechelen, on 10 October 1944.

== Later significance ==
=== War crimes trials ===
Trials of the Flemish SS guards, considered Nazi collaborators, were held during 1946 in Mechelen and included some guards and officials at Fort Breendonk.

Of those who were convicted, 18 were sentenced to be executed by firing squad in 1947, two of whom appealed their case and had their sentences revised to life imprisonment. Four others were sentenced to life in prison, one to 20 years in prison, one other was acquitted, and two guards who were sentenced to life were never found.

The Nazi camp commandant, Philipp Schmitt, was tried in Antwerp in 1949 as a war criminal; the court martial sentenced him to death and he was shot by a firing squad on 9 August 1950. He never showed any remorse and denied all of the atrocities that occurred at Breendonk, claiming he was merely re-educating the inmates as he had been ordered.

=== Museum and memorial ===
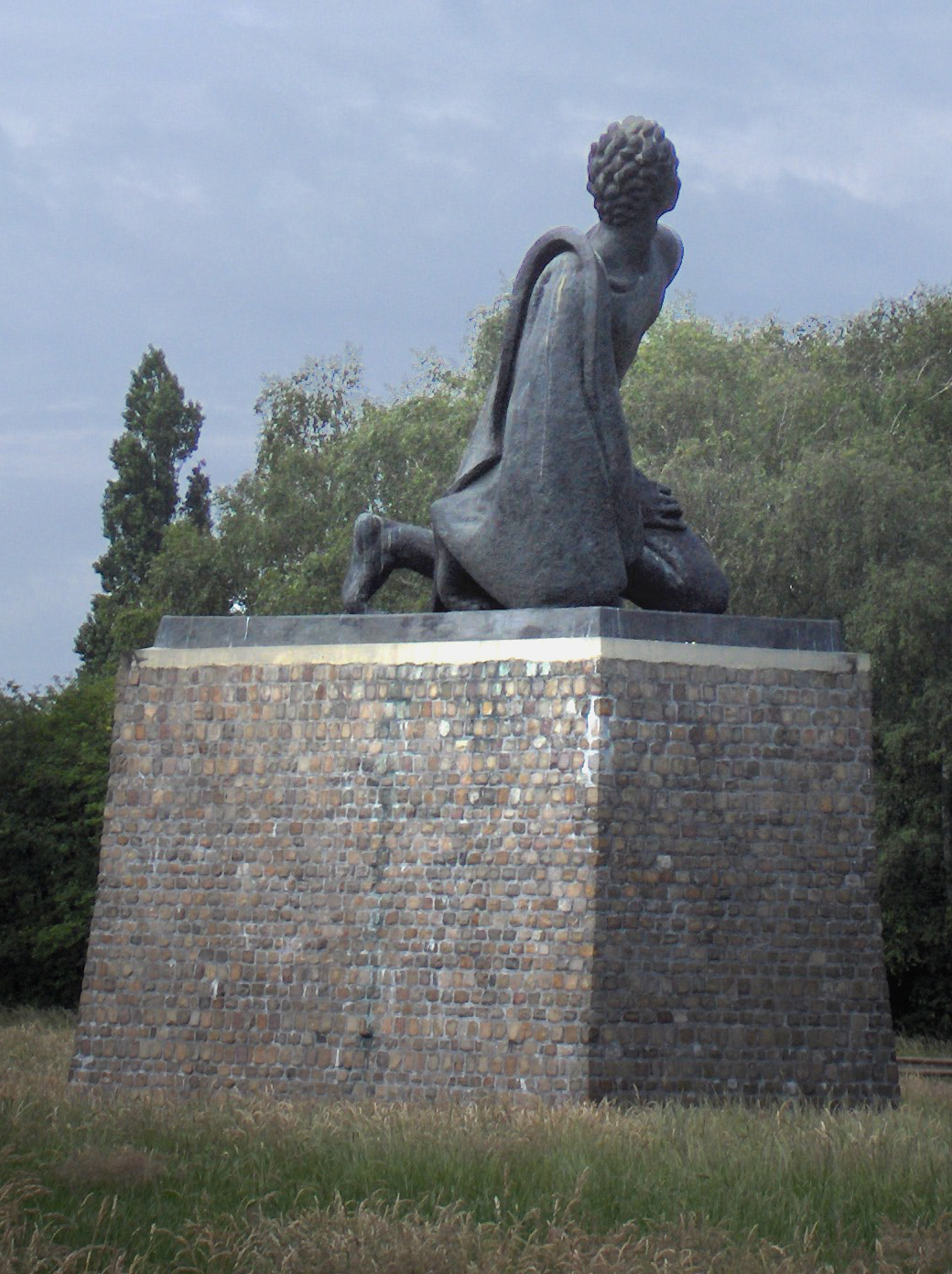
The Political Prisoner (1947) by Idel Ianchelevici at Breendonk

In 1947 Fort Breendonk was declared to be a national memorial, recognizing the suffering and cruelty that had been inflicted on Belgian prisoners during World War II. The fort is now a well-preserved example of the prison camps operated by Nazi Germany and a national museum. The Fort is open to visitors all year round and is located close to the A12 Brussels-Antwerp motorway.

Pictures of working Nazi internment camps during the war are rare and, for a long time, it was believed that absolutely no pictures of Breendonk during the war existed. But in the early 1970s a batch of photos of the camp was discovered among the possessions of Dutch photographer Otto Spronk. He had collected thousands of pictures and films of the Third Reich as part of his work for the Centre for Historical Research and Documentation on War and Contemporary Society (Cegesoma). The collection consisted of 37 pictures depicting daily life in the camp. They were taken by German Nazi photographer Otto Kropf for propaganda purposes but were never used. All pictures are essentially cliche stills; none of the daily atrocities or horrors of the camp are shown. But they are the only reference material available. Several of the inmates in the pictures managed to survive the war and were able to identify the others in the pictures and the circumstances in which they were taken.

== See also ==
- List of Nazi-German concentration camps
- Citadel of Huy
- Nazi concentration camps
- The Holocaust
