= Alex Kurzem =

Australian Holocaust survivor (1933–2022)

- Born: 18 November 1933
- Died: 31 January 2022 (aged 88); Melbourne, Australia
- Known for: Holocaust memoir The Mascot

Alex (Uldis) Kurzem (also Uldis Kurzemnieks, 18 November 1933 – 31 January 2022) was an Australian pensioner originally from the Byelorussian Soviet Socialist Republic, and a centre-point of a long-standing controversy regarding his Holocaust memoir which has led to a financial windfall in the early 21st century. He was the subject of a television documentary and a best-selling book by his son, translated into 13 languages; both entitled The Mascot.

According to the story, Alex Kurzem is the former boy mascot (hence the book title) of a Latvian police Schutzmannschaft Battalion 18, who witnessed the massacre of his Jewish mother as a five-year-old boy and subsequently emigrated to Australia. Kurzem maintained that he was a Holocaust survivor from Belarus. However, the authenticity of his account has been called into question at several points. When put under further scrutiny by the Jewish-American scholars and asked to prove his survivor's tale by taking a DNA test, Kurzem refused. He also dismissed out of hand the archival records of the Hoover Institution at Stanford University as allegedly falsified but eventually admitted: "I might be anybody, but I have got no proof who I am."

In 2020, genetic genealogist Colleen Fitzpatrick concluded that Kurzem is 100% Ashkenazi Jewish came from the region of Belarus he claimed to, and had living relatives in Canada. These cousins provided family photographs that bolster the case for Kurzem's account of his origin.

== Biography ==
Kurzem claimed he pieced together his childhood memories with the help of his son, as well as with documents and evidence discovered while in search of his forgotten identity. He concluded that he was Ilya or Ellyeh the Yiddish pronunciation of Elija, and that his parents were Solomon Galperin (in Hassidic Yiddish pronounced Shloimeh Halpern) and Chana Gildenberg (the Hassidic Yiddish pronunciation of Goldenberg), who were Jewish. On October 21, 1941, Gildenberg and her son Duvid and daughter were murdered along with approximately 1,600 other Jews in Koidanova (Koydanava, now Dzyarzhynsk, Belarus). Solomon Galperin escaped extermination and joined a group of Soviet partisans. He was later caught and sent to Auschwitz, returning to Dzyarzhynsk after the war. He remarried, and, according to his newly born son, died in 1975 without ever knowing that his eldest son had survived.

Kurzem said that he escaped, while seeing the mass murder and that after months of living in the forest he was captured and taken to a site where Jews were being assassinated. He was saved from probable death by Jēkabs Kūlis, a sergeant of a Latvian police battalion after begging for bread and making the drunken soldiers laugh. Kūlis adopted him as the battalion's mascot, after secretly warning him never to reveal his Jewish identity. According to Kurzem's memory Kulis and his commander, Kārlis Lobe changed the story and rehearsed with him a narrative by which he was a Russian orphan who had lost his parents in the forest. The story was reiterated to him following the war by his former commanders and Latvian family. This was the narrative he told his family until he began opening up to the past.

Throughout his childhood, Kurzem appeared in Nazi propaganda media as an Aryan mascot, including at least one newsreel. Kurzem claims that on one occasion his commanding officer Kārlis Lobe ordered him to hand out chocolates to other Jews to calm them as they boarded trucks that took them to be exterminated at the chocolate Laima factory in Riga (no such event at the factory has ever been documented).

In 1944, according to Kurzem, with the Nazis facing almost certain defeat, and after trying to escape the unit in the marshes of the Volkhov Front, the commander of the Latvian Legion unit (parts of the Latvian police battalions were merged into the legion in 1943) sent Kurzem to live with a Latvian family, and with them was removed to a displaced persons camp in Hamburg, Germany, from which he emigrated to Australia in 1949. He worked in a circus and eventually became a television repair man in Melbourne. He had three sons with his wife Patricia (died 2003). All the time, he kept his past life to himself, not even telling his wife or children. It was not until 1997 that he finally told his family, and along with his son, Mark, set about discovering more about his past.

== Media ==
In 2002, Kurzem's son Mark (died 2010) wrote and produced a documentary (with Lina Caneva) entitled The Mascot, which tells his father's story of his childhood with the Latvian SS. Mark subsequently wrote a book, The Mascot, Unravelling the Mystery of My Jewish Father's Nazi Boyhood, which tells the same story. It was reported his story has inspired a full-length Hollywood feature film.

In 2025, Dan Goldberg released a documentary, The Jewish Nazi?, about the subject.

== Controversy ==
Suspicions about the accuracy and authenticity of Kurzem's story were first raised in the late 1990s at the Melbourne Holocaust Centre, when, according to Forensic researcher Colleen Fitzpatrick, a visiting Kurzem offered to pay $17,000 to say he was Jewish. Fitzpatrick, who was previously instrumental in exposing two books about the Holocaust as fraudulent, wrote in 2012 that there are similarities in Kurzem's narrative to other falsified Holocaust narratives. She further reported that Maisel had read accounts from the Yizkor book of Koidanow stating that the 1941 massacre was done in a surprise action and was over within hours - contrary to Kurzem's claims. Both Fitzpatrick and Maisel had received evasive answers from Kurzem when asking him about memories that most survivors find emotionally charged, specifically his family's murder and how he hid his circumcision from others.

Kurzem has received reparations from the Jewish Claims Conference as a victim of Nazi persecution. Fitzpatrick discovered that the GILF document on which Kurzem's reparations were based had been altered; although Kurzem claims that these alterations were performed to translate the originally Russian-language document into English, the original document has never been supplied. No records of an Ilya Galpern/Halperin nor his mother exist, although records of other Galperin family members murdered in the town do.

On May 19, 2011, Melbourne reporter Keith Moor published an article that questions the veracity of Kurzem's story and reports of simultaneous investigations by the German and U.S. governments as well as the Jewish Claims Conference into Kurzem's claims of actually being Jewish and a victim of Nazi persecution. On September 21, 2012, Dan Goldman, a reporter for Israel's daily newspaper Haaretz, published an article about the investigation into Kurzem's story. Kurzem was quoted in the article that he "never said" he was Ilya Galperin. Despite previously asking to take a DNA test as reported by Keith Moor in 2011, Goldberg reports that Kurzem will take the test.

As of 2013, Alex Kurzem has been cleared to continue receiving compensation from the German Government. The Jewish Claims Conference ordered the investigation. The report of the ombudsman was "satisfied Mr Kurzem was Jewish; was separated from his parents during the war; lived under a false identity for at least 18 months, and; that his life had been in danger".

There is no doubt that he is the "mascot" boy, but the members of the Latvian Legion unit still claim they were not part of the Slonim massacre and had not participated in any atrocities in accordance with the deposition Kurzem wrote for Kārlis Lobe. In the book Mark Kurzem tells of the doubts raised on both sides, claiming the Latvian denials were planned and expected but that the Jewish ones were a surprise.

The board member of the Melbourne Latvian Society, Edgars Laķis, told the Latvian-Australian newspaper Latvietis in 2017 that Lobe had sent Alex from the Volkhov trenches to the Laima factory to be raised in more suitable conditions by the factory's manager, Jēkabs Dzenis (Laķis' father-in-law), and his family, who all left for Australia via Germany in 1949. In Australia, Alex was also baptized in a Latvian Lutheran church and had cordial relations with his foster family until the publication of the book, which, in Laķis' account, wrongfully accused Dzenis and Latvians of being complicit in war crimes. Dzenis' grandson Māris unsuccessfully wrote in protest to the publisher to have the book recalled; plans to file a lawsuit for defamation were halted after the death of Mark Kurzem.

In 2019 Kurzem undertook a DNA test and in 2020, Fitzpatrick concluded that Kurzem is 100% Ashkenazi Jewish, comes from the region of Belarus he claimed to, and has living relatives in Canada. These cousins provided family photographs that bolster the case for Kurzem's account of his origin.

== Death ==
Kurzem died of COVID-19 in Melbourne, on 31 January 2022, at the age of 88.

== See also ==
- Misha Defonseca (Misha: A Mémoire of the Holocaust Years, 1997)
- Martin Grey (Au nom de tous les miens)
- Herman Rosenblat (Angel at the Fence)
- Rosemarie Pence (Hannah: From Dachau to the Olympics and Beyond, 2005)
- Enric Marco (Memorias del infierno, 1978)
- Donald J. Watt (Stoker, 1995)
- Denis Avey (The Man who Broke into Auschwitz, 2011)
- Binjamin Wilkomirski (Fragments, 1995)

== Bibliography ==
- Mark Kurzem & Lina Caneva, The Mascot (Australian documentary for ABC television, 2002)
- Mark Kurzem, The Mascot (2007)
