= Donald J. Watt =

Australian literary hoaxer

Donald Joseph Watt (10 August 1918 – 28 May 2000) was an Australian Army soldier and the author of a literary hoax, a fictitious Holocaust memoir entitled Stoker: The Story of an Australian Soldier who Survived Auschwitz-Birkenau, published in 1995 by Simon & Schuster. Only the disclosure of Watt's fabrications altered the status of the book which was initially praised by various Jewish organizations as the most important work written in Australia.

Watt was born in Mildura, Victoria, Australia in August 1918. In the book, Watt described being sent to Auschwitz concentration camp by the Nazis soon after he was recaptured trying to escape from a German POW camp. He claimed to have been forced to work as Sonderkommando in the crematorium attached to the gas chambers. Reportedly, the fraud enabled Watt to receive monetary compensation from the Australian government as a Holocaust victim. A number of institutions unknowingly associated themselves with the forgery partly because it was published with the financial help from the popular Jewish-Australian benefactor John Saunders.

The memoir was discredited by historical experts from Yad Vashem, the Auschwitz Museum, the United States Holocaust Memorial Museum and, most importantly, by Professor Konrad Kwiet, historian at the Sydney Jewish Museum and the former chief historian of the Australian War Crimes Commission.

Watt latterly lived in Tweed Heads, New South Wales, where he died on 28 May 2000, at the age of 81.

== Bibliography ==
- Donald Watt, Stoker : the story of an Australian soldier who survived Auschwitz-Birkenau, 1995, English, Illustrated edition. Other Authors: Mazal Holocaust Collection. Published: East Roseville, N.S.W. : Simon & Schuster.

== See also ==
- Misha Defonseca (Misha: A Mémoire of the Holocaust Years, 1997)
- Martin Grey (Au nom de tous les miens)
- Herman Rosenblat (Angel at the Fence)
- Rosemarie Pence (Hannah: From Dachau to the Olympics and Beyond, 2005)
- Enric Marco (Memorias del infierno, 1978)
- Binjamin Wilkomirski (Fragments: Memories of a Wartime Childhood, 1995)
- Denis Avey (The Man who Broke into Auschwitz, 2011)
- Laurel Rose Willson
- Alex Kurzem
