= Angel at the Fence =

Book by Herman Rosenblat

Angel at the Fence: The True Story of a Love that Survived
- Author: Herman Rosenblat
- Language: English
- Subject: Holocaust memoir, love story
- Publisher: Berkley Books
- Publication date: Cancelled (originally February 3, 2009)
- Publication place: United States
- Media type: Print (hardcover)
- Pages: 304 pp (first edition)
- ISBN: 978-0-425-22581-3

Angel at the Fence: The True Story of a Love That Survived, written by Herman Rosenblat, was a fictitious Holocaust memoir purporting to tell the true story of the author's reunion with, and marriage to, a girl who had passed him food through the barbed-wire fence when he was imprisoned at the Schlieben subcamp of the Buchenwald concentration camp in World War II. The book was scheduled for publication by Berkley Books in February 2009, but its publication was canceled on December 27, 2008, when it was discovered that the book's central events were untrue.

Prior to being exposed as a fabrication, the film rights to the book were purchased for $25 million by producer Harris Salomon of Atlantic Overseas Pictures. Other fans of the story included Oprah Winfrey, who described it as the single greatest love story she had heard in 22 years of doing her show.

== Summary ==
Fabricated by Rosenblat, the story states that, beginning in the winter of 1944, a nine-year-old Jewish girl, posing as a Christian from a local farm, met Rosenblat at the electrified perimeter fence of the Schlieben concentration camp and tossed him an apple over the fence. She continued passing him food for seven months until he was transferred to another camp. According to Rosenblat, they met in 1957 on a blind date at Coney Island, New York, and, while relating their personal histories, discovered their shared past. Shortly afterwards, they married.

== Authenticity questioned ==
Several Holocaust scholars, including Deborah Lipstadt, raised questions about “the central premise of his narrative — that a girl met him at the fence and that very girl became his wife,” and suggested that that premise "is, at the very least, an embellishment, and at worst, a wholesale fabrication." Friends and family members also raised questions about the truth of statements in the book.

Professor Kenneth Waltzer, director of the Jewish Studies program at Michigan State University, stated that maps of Schlieben indicate that neither prisoners nor civilians could have approached the perimeter fence because one could only obtain access immediately next to the SS barracks. Waltzer also determined that Rosenblat's wife, as well as her family, were hidden as Christians at a farm near Breslau, 210 miles away from Schlieben. A number of researchers, including forensic genealogists Sharon Sergeant and Colleen Fitzpatrick, as well as several Holocaust survivors, worked with Waltzer in uncovering the deception and bringing it to the attention of reporters.

Rosenblat and the publisher initially maintained that the story was truthful. Berkley Books subsequently stated that it was "canceling publication of Angel at the Fence after receiving new information from Herman Rosenblat's agent, Andrea Hurst," and "will demand that the author and the agent return all money that they have received for this work." Rosenblat, who was in fact imprisoned in Schlieben, has acknowledged that the story of meeting his wife there was invented.

== Related works ==
A children's version of the story, entitled Angel Girl (ISBN 978-0822-58739-2), written by Laurie Friedman and illustrated by Ofra Amit, was published in September 2008 by Carolrhoda Books of Lerner Publishing Group.

In August 2009, York House Press published a paperback by Penelope Holt titled The Apple: Based on the Herman Rosenblat Holocaust Love Story (ISBN 978-0979195648).

In June 2010, Salomon and Atlantic Overseas Pictures signed a co-production agreement with Castel Film Studios, the largest film studio in Central and Eastern Europe and the studio for Cold Mountain and Borat, to produce a feature film on the Herman Rosenblat affair, in spite of the cancellation of the story's publication. The $25 million film adaptation of the book, titled Flower of the Fence, was to be based on an original screenplay by Ivo Marloh, and was to be shot in 2011. Salomon said the film would be a "loose and fictionalised adaptation" unaffected by issues with the memoir's authenticity. The film, however, was never made.

== See also ==
- Misha Defonseca (Misha: A Mémoire of the Holocaust Years, 1997)
- Martin Grey (Au nom de tous les miens)
- Binjamin Wilkomirski (Fragments: Memories of a Wartime Childhood, 1995)
- Rosemarie Pence (Hannah: From Dachau to the Olympics and Beyond, 2005)
- Enric Marco (Memorias del infierno, 1978)
- Donald J. Watt (Stoker, 1995)
- Denis Avey (The Man who Broke into Auschwitz, 2011)
