= Misha and the Wolves =

- Poster
- Directed by: Sam Hobkinson
- Cinematography: Will Pugh
- Edited by: Peter Norrey
- Music by: Nick Foster
- Production companies: Arts Alliance Productions; MetFilm; Bright Yellow Films; Las Belgas; Take Five; APT Films; BBC Storyville; ZDF; Arte; Vpro
- Distributed by: Netflix
- Release dates: January 31, 2021 (Sundance); August 11, 2021 (Netflix)
- Running time: 90 minutes
- Countries: Belgium; United Kingdom
- Languages: English; French

Misha and the Wolves is a 2021 documentary film written and directed by Sam Hobkinson. The film examines the fraudulent 1997 Holocaust memoir of Misha Defonseca.

The film premiered at the 2021 Sundance Film Festival on January 31, 2021. On August 11, 2021, it became available on Netflix.

== Synopsis ==
After Defonseca's memoir, titled Misha: A Mémoire of the Holocaust Years, became a global success, her publisher began to question its veracity.

== Interviewees ==
- Jane Daniel, publisher with Mt. Ivy Press
- Emma De Wael, Misha's aunt
- Pat Cunningham, Misha's neighbor in Millis, Massachusetts
- Debórah Dwork, Clark University professor of Holocaust history
- Evelyne Haendel, Belgian genealogist and Holocaust survivor
- Ramona Hamblin, Misha's attorney
- Marie-Claire Mommer, psychology instructor
- Candy O'Terry, WMJX, Magic 106.7/Boston. Creator & host of the weekly series Exceptional Women
- Sharon Sergeant, forensic genealogist
- Karen Schulman, former friend of Misha in Millis, Massachusetts
- Joni Soffron, staff member with Wolf Hollow animal sanctuary
- Jean-Philippe Tondeur, military historian
- Marc Metdepenningen, Belgian journalist

== Reception ==
On the review aggregator website Rotten Tomatoes, 84% of 31 critics' reviews are positive, with an average rating of 7.2/10. The website's critics consensus reads, "A stranger-than-fiction account of a too-incredible-to-be-true story, Misha and the Wolves is an engaging documentary wrapped in a thrilling mystery." Metacritic, which uses a weighted average, assigned the film a score of 61 out of 100, based on 8 critics, indicating "generally favorable" reviews.
