= Misha Defonseca =

Author of a fraudulent Holocaust memoir

- Born: Monique de Wael; 12 May 1937 (age 89); Etterbeek, Belgium
- Occupations: Novelist, writer
- Known for: Writing a fraudulent Holocaust memoir
- Spouse: Maurice Defonseca

Misha Defonseca (born Monique de Wael, 12 May 1937) is a Belgian-born impostor and the author of a fraudulent 1997 Holocaust memoir titled Misha: A Mémoire of the Holocaust Years, initially presented as true.

== Background ==
Misha became an instant success in Europe and was translated into 18 languages. The French version of the book was based on the earlier Survivre avec les loups (Surviving with Wolves), which was published in 1997 by the Éditions Robert Laffont. The second version was adapted into the French film of the same name in 2007.

On 29 February 2008, the author and her lawyers admitted that the bestselling book was not an autobiographical work but a fraud. In 2014, a U.S. court ordered Defonseca to repay her U.S. publisher, Mt. Ivy Press, $22 million that she had been awarded in an earlier legal suit against the publisher.

== Biography ==
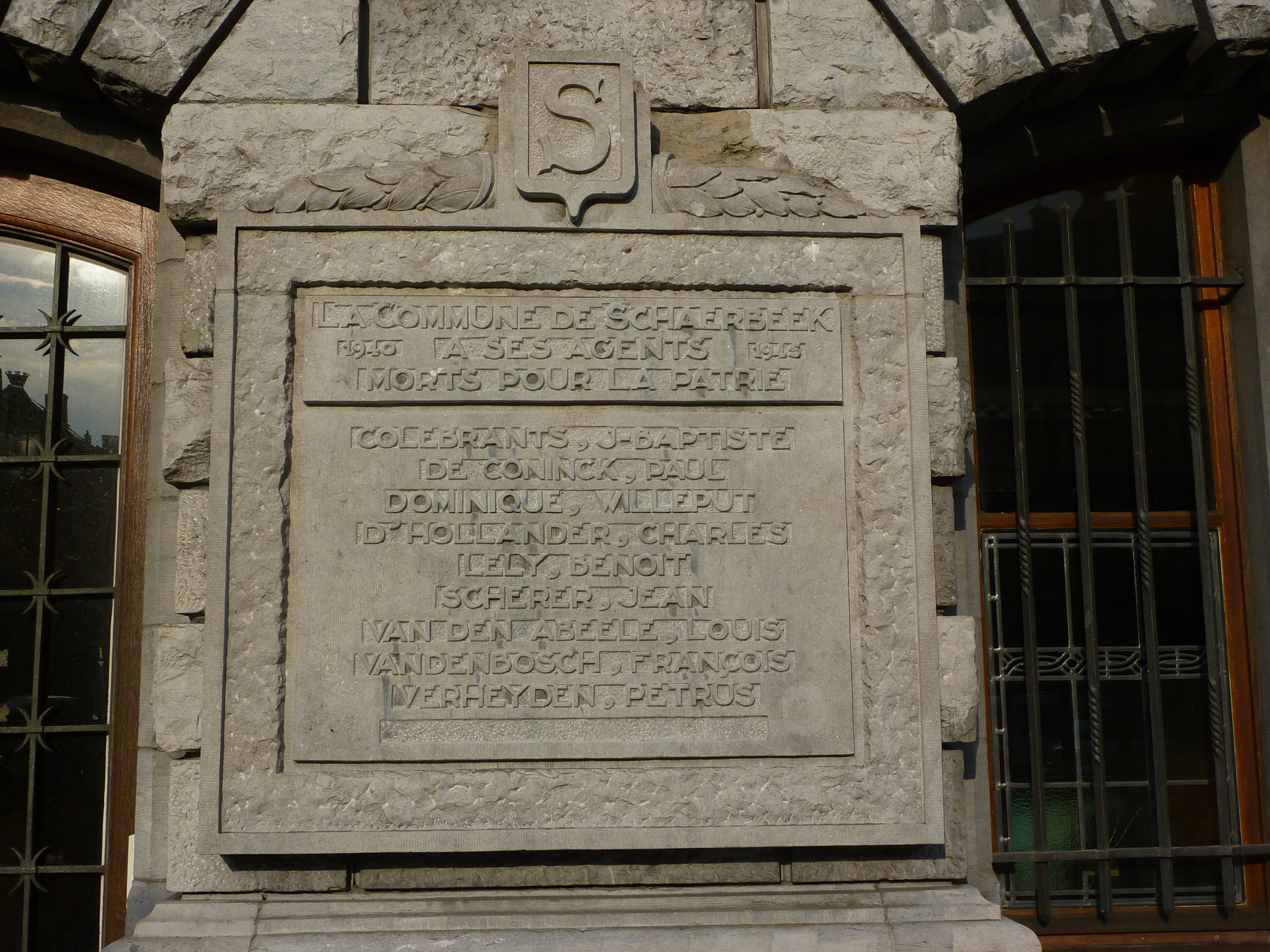
Plaque in Schaerbeek to employees of the local government who "died for the nation" in the Second World War. The blank line at the bottom once held De Wael's father's name.

Defonseca was born Monique de Wael on 12 May 1937 in Etterbeek, Belgium, the daughter of Catholic parents who were arrested, deported, and murdered by the Nazis for being resistance members. After her parents' arrest, Monique was sent to live with her grandparents, then her uncle. In the local community, she was known as the "daughter of the traitor," as her father, Robert de Wael, was accused of disclosing the names of resistance members to the Nazis during his imprisonment. After being liberated, her father's name was erased from the stone plaque in honour of the local Nazi-victim employees on the walls of the Schaerbeek municipality.

Defonseca and her husband, Maurice, moved to the United States from Paris in 1988 and bought a house in Millis, Massachusetts. Maurice was unemployed by the mid-1990s. Defonseca began to imagine a vivid story about her childhood, including having wandered across Europe at the age of six after her parents were deported in 1941, being sheltered by friendly packs of wolves, killing a German soldier in self-defense, sneaking into and out of the Warsaw Ghetto, and finding her way home at the end of the war. Jane Daniel, a local book publisher, convinced Defonseca to write a memoir about her alleged past after she heard the writer tell the story in a Massachusetts synagogue. Daniel published Misha: A Memoire of the Holocaust Years in 1997 through her "one woman operation", Mt. Ivy Press.

Prior to the uncovering of the hoax, the book had led to a multimillion-dollar legal battle between Defonseca and the book's ghostwriter, Vera Lee, against Jane Daniel and Mt. Ivy Press. Daniel and Defonseca fell out over profits received from the best-selling book, which led to a lawsuit. In 2005, a Boston court ordered Daniel to pay Defonseca and Lee $22.5 million. Defonseca's lawyers said Daniel had not paid the court-ordered sum. Following her admission, a court in 2014 ordered Defonseca to repay the full amount.

Despite the book's popularity, many critics pointed to passages that were logically or historically implausible. The first person who publicly doubted the authenticity of the story was Henryk M. Broder, who wrote an article about Defonseca in 1996 for the German news magazine Der Spiegel. In late February 2008, a baptismal certificate from a Brussels church for a Monique de Wael and a register from an elementary school near the de Waels' home showing Monique enrolled there in September 1943 – two years after Misha claimed to have left Brussels – were posted by Jane Daniel on her blog. Belgian national newspaper Le Soir soon reported these findings. Finally the leading historian of the Shoah in Belgium, Maxime Steinberg, pointed out the story's historical anomalies and errors.

On 29 February 2008, Defonseca admitted to Le Soir that she had fabricated the tale, after she had been presented with what the paper described as "irrefutable" evidence that her story was false. "The book is a story, it's my story," said the writer in a statement issued under her real name. "It's not the true reality, but it is my reality. There are times when I find it difficult to differentiate between reality and my inner world." Defonseca told Le Soir that she had always wanted to forget her real name because she had been called "the traitor's daughter."

Forensic genealogists Sharon Sergeant and Colleen M. Fitzpatrick led the team which was instrumental in uncovering the hoax.

Misha Defonseca and her memoir are the subject of the documentary film Misha and the Wolves, released on Netflix in 2021, exposing how she ended up fabricating her story. The documentary reveals that Defonseca, prior to the controversy, was slated to appear on The Oprah Winfrey Show as part of Oprah's Book Club. A segment was even filmed for the broadcast with Defonseca interacting with a live wolf, but afterwards Defonseca canceled the appearance.

== See also ==
- List of imposters §False minority national identity claims
- Misery literature
- Fake memoir
- Wilkomirski syndrome
- Herman Rosenblat (Angel at the Fence)
- Martin Grey (Au nom de tous les miens)
- Binjamin Wilkomirski (Fragments: Memories of a Wartime Childhood, 1995)
- Rosemarie Pence (Hannah: From Dachau to the Olympics and Beyond, 2005)
- Enric Marco (Memorias del infierno, 1978)
- Donald J. Watt (Stoker, 1995)
- Denis Avey (The Man who Broke into Auschwitz, 2011)
- James Frey (A Million Little Pieces, 2003)
