= Marc Metdepenningen =

Belgian journalist (1958–2020)

- Born: 16 February 1958; Ixelles, Belgium
- Died: 8 November 2020 (aged 62); Koksijde, Belgium
- Occupation: Journalist

Marc Metdepenningen (16 February 1958 – 8 November 2020) was a Belgian journalist.

== Career ==
He began working for Le Soir in 1984 and specialized in criminal affairs. He notably covered the Dutroux Affair and Michel Fourniret. He also unveiled the fraudulent case of Misha Defonseca's memoir. Throughout his career, he covered numerous criminal and civil cases. He also served as President of the Journalistes du journal Le Soir.

Marc Metdepenningen died in Koksijde on 8 November 2020 at the age of 62.

== Publications ==
- Les grands dossiers criminels en Belgique (2005)
- Crimes & châtiments dans l'histoire judiciaire belge (2019)
