= Maxime Steinberg =

Belgian historian (1936–2010)

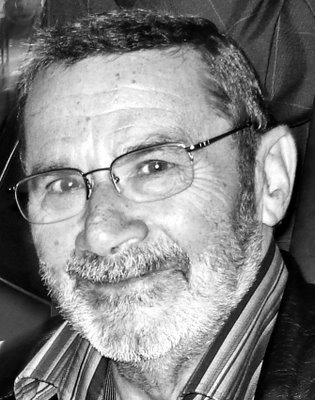
- Steinberg, pictured in 2008
- Born: 13 December 1936; Brussels, Belgium
- Died: 26 July 2010 (aged 73)
- Education: Free University of Brussels
- Known for: Historian of the Holocaust in Belgium
- Scientific career
- Doctoral advisor: Jean Stengers
- Website: www.maximesteinberg.org

Maxime Steinberg (1936–2010) was a Belgian historian and teacher who wrote extensively on the Holocaust in Belgium. He has been described as "Belgium's principal Holocaust historian" and was best known for his three-part history of the subject entitled L'Étoile et le Fusil (French; lit. 'The Star and the Rifle'), published in 1983–87.

== Biography ==
Maxime Steinberg was born into a Jewish family in Brussels, Belgium, on 13 December 1936. His father had immigrated from Poland in 1930. During World War II, his parents were arrested and deported to Nazi concentration camps in the Holocaust. His mother was killed. Maxime and his brother survived the war as hidden children (enfants cachés) in rural Walloon Brabant.

Steinberg studied at the Free University of Brussels (ULB) under Jean Stengers, initially interested in the history of the Belgian far-left. He worked as a history teacher and was active within the General Union of Public Services (Centrale Générale des Services Publics, CGSP) and was political secretary of the education section of the Communist Party of Belgium. In 1982, he returned to ULB to work as an associate professor at the Institute for the Study of Judaism (Institut d'Etudes du Judaïsme). He completed his doctoral thesis on the Holocaust in Belgium in 1987 under Stengers' supervision. He was the first academic historian in Belgium to focus directly on the Holocaust. His role in Belgian historiography has been compared to that of Serge Klarsfeld in France.

Steinberg is best known for his magnum opus on the Holocaust in Belgium, published as L'Étoile et le Fusil ("The Star and the Rifle") between 1983 and 1987 which grew out of his doctoral dissertation. The series "revolutionised historiography on the persecution of the Jews in Belgium". It was published in three volumes (four tomes), representing the first scholarly narrative on the subject. There had been approximately 66,000 Jews living in Belgium on the eve of the German invasion of May 1940 of whom at least 28,000 were deported and killed in Nazi concentration camps. Only approximately 4,000 held Belgian citizenship. According to the historian Lieven Saerens, the series

analysed in minute detail the steps taken by the Germans to further isolate the Jews and the devastating role which the 'policy of the lesser evil' of the Belgian authorities had played here. He analysed what he described as the 'xenophobic paradox of the Endlösung'. He described how the occupier had taken the xenophobia of the Belgian authorities into account in the execution of the 'Endlösung'. Steinberg did not conceive this xenophobia as a manifest, omnipresent hatred of aliens, but as the historical fact that the Belgian authorities did not feel responsible for the aliens who resided on the Belgian territory. Only when the Jews who had been naturalised as Belgians were concerned did a formal protest from the Belgian authorities follow. The responsibility of the Association of Jews in Belgium, founded by the occupier, was given due attention. But just as much did he do justice to the non-Jewish helpers.

Steinberg was also known as a public historian. He served as a historical expert witness called during the much-publicized trial of Kurt Asche in West Germany (1980–81) and was on the committee responsible for designing the permanent exhibition at the Museum of the Deportation and Resistance in Mechelen, Belgium in 1995. He was also consulted by the Auschwitz Museum. He was one of the experts consulted on the literary hoax Misha: A Mémoire of the Holocaust Years (1997) by Misha Defonseca.

Steinberg was a member of the Union des Progressistes Juifs de Belgique. He was a vocal public critic of Holocaust denial.

Steinberg's life was the subject of the documentary Maxime Steinberg, un seul homme peut faire la différence (lit. 'Maxime Steinberg, one man can make a difference') which was broadcast on RTBF on 25 September 2022.

== Main works ==
- Extermination, Sauvetage et Résistance des Juifs de Belgique, Bulletin périodique de documentation no. 4. Bruxelles: S. Scheebalg, April 1979; Dutch-language edition: Uitroeiing, redding en verzet van de Joden in België, Periodiek van documentatie nr. 4. Brussel: S. Schneebalg, April 1979; 63 p.
- 'The trap of legality: the Association of the Jews of Belgium', in: Yisrael Gutman, Cynthia J. Haft (eds.), Patterns of Jewish Leadership in Nazi Europe 1933–1945. Proceedings of the Third Yad Vashem International Historical Conference, Jerusalem, April 4–7, 1977 (Jerusalem: Yad Vashem, 1979), pp. 353–375. Reprint in: Michael R. Marrus (ed.), The Nazi Holocaust; historical articles on the destruction of European Jews (Westport Ct. USA: Meckler, 1989; 15 vols.), vol. VI-2, pp. 797–820.
- (with Serge Klarsfeld) Die Endlösung der Judenfrage in Belgien. Dokumente (The Final Solution of the Jewish Question in Belgium. Documents). New York/Paris: The Beate Klarsfeld Foundation/CDJC, 1980.
- Le Dossier Bruxelles-Auschwitz. La police SS et l’extermination des Juifs de Belgique. Bruxelles: Comité belge de Soutien à la partie civile dans le procès des officiers SS Ehlers, Asche, Canaris, responsables de la déportation des Juifs de Belgique, October 1980; 224 p. Dutch-language edition: Dossier Brussel-Auschwitz. De SS-politie en de uitroeiïng van de joden. Brussel: Steuncomité bij de burgerlijke partij in het proces tegen de voormalige SS-officieren Ehlers, Asche, Canaris, verantwoordelijk voor de wegvoering van de joden van België, April 1981; 232 p.
- (with Serge Klarsfeld) Mémorial de la déportation des Juifs de Belgique. Bruxelles/New York: Union des Déportés juifs en Belgiques/The Beate Klarsfeld Foundation, 1982; second, revised edition. Revised and updated Dutch-language edition: Memoriaal van de deportatie der Joden uit België. Brussels/New York: Vereniging der joodse weggevoerden en rechthebbenden in België, The Beate Klarsfeld Foundation, 1992.
- L’Étoile et le Fusil, tome I: La question juive 1940–1942. Bruxelles: Vie Ouvrière, 1983.
- L’Étoile et le Fusil, tome II: 1942: les cent jours de la déportation des Juifs de Belgique. Bruxelles: Vie Ouvrière, 1984.
- L’Étoile et le Fusil, tome III: La traque des Juifs, 1942–1944. Bruxelles: Vie Ouvrière, 1987; 2 volumes (book edition of the author's Ph.D. dissertation).
- 'Faced with the Final Solution in Occupied Belgium. The Church’s Silence and Christian Action', in: Yehuda Bauer et al. (eds.), Remembering for the Future. Working Papers and Addenda (Oxford etc.: Pergamon Press, 1989), vol. 3, pp. 2745–2758.
- Les yeux du témoin et le regard du borgne. L'histoire face au révisionnisme. Paris: Le Cerf, 1990. Dutch-language edition (translated by Johan de Roey): De ogen van het monster. De holocaust dag in dag uit. Antwerp/Baarn: Hadewijch, 1992; 182 p.
- 'The Jews in the Years 1940–1944: Three Strategies for Coping with a Tragedy', in: Dan Michman (ed.), Belgium and the Holocaust: Jews, Belgians, Germans (Jerusalem: Yad Vashem/Ramat-Gan: Bar-Ilan University, 1998), pp. 347–372.
- Un pays occupé et ses Juifs: Belgique entre France et Pays-Bas. Gerpinnes: Quorum, en collaboration avec le Centre Européen d'Études sur la Shoah, l'Antisémitisme et le Génocide (CEESAG), laboratoire de l'Institut d'Études du Judaïsme près de l'Université Libre de Bruxelles (ULB), 1999; 314 p.
- La Persécution des Juifs en Belgique (1940–1945). Bruxelles: Complexe, 2004; 318 p. (augmented and updated book edition of a research report originally compiled within the framework of the interdisciplinary research project 'Holocaust and "Polycracy" in Western Europe, 1940-1944', University of Konstanz).
- (with Laurence Schram) Transport XX. Mechelen-Auschwitz. Brussels: VUB Press, 2008.
- (with Laurence Schram, Ward Adriaens, Eric Hautermann, Patricia Ramet) Mecheln-Auschwitz 1942–1944 (Brussels: VUB Press, 2009; 1600 p.).
