= Wat Phrabat Namphu =

Buddhist temple in Lopburi province, Thailand

- วัดพระบาทน้ำพุ
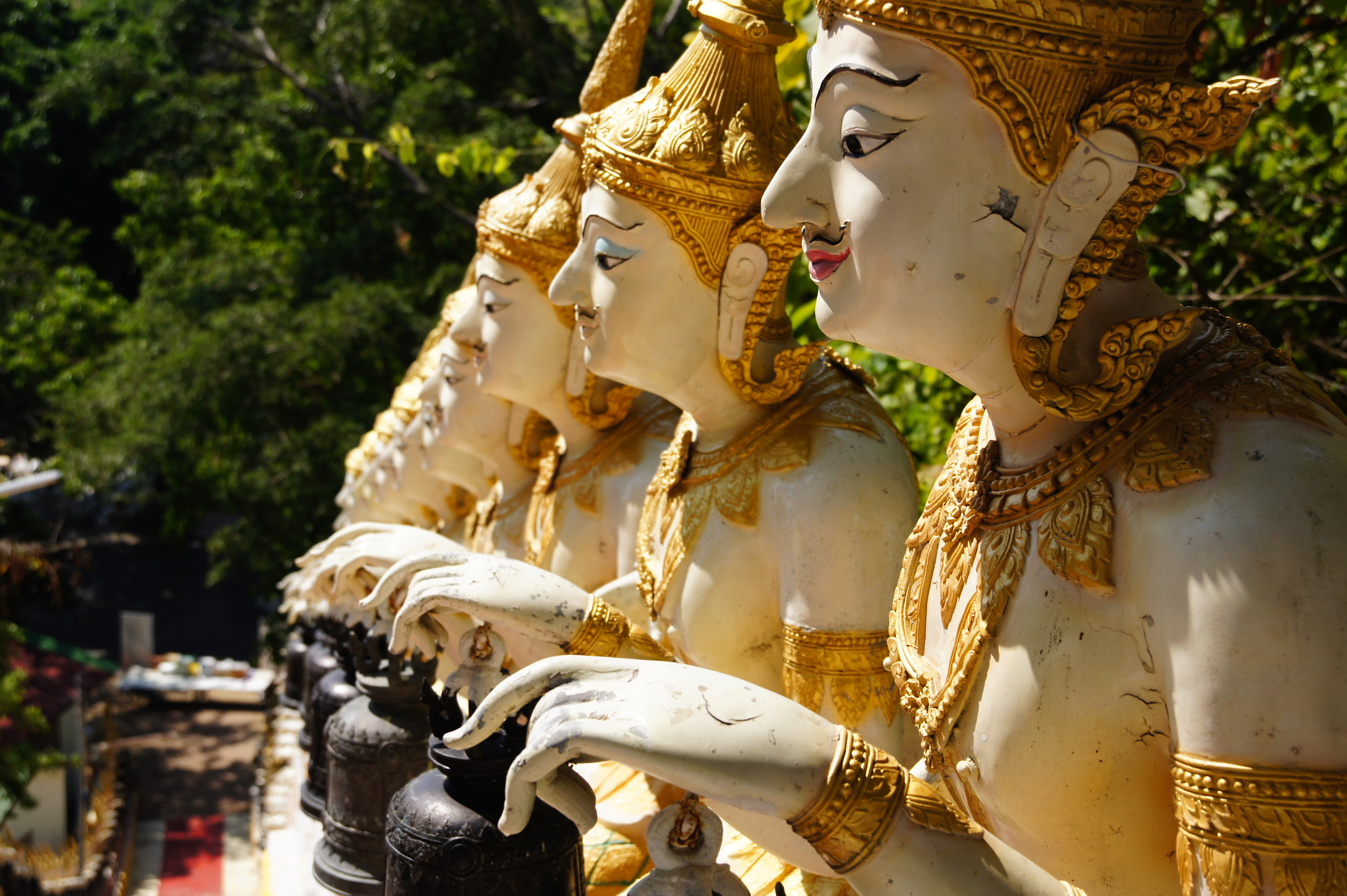

Religion
- Affiliation: Buddhism
- Interactive map of Wat Phrabat Namphu

Wat Phrabat Namphu (Thai: วัดพระบาทน้ำพุ) is a Buddhist temple in Lop Buri province, Thailand, founded in 1992. The temple is known for its role as a hospice for HIV-positive patients.

== 2025 financial scandal ==
At 1 AM on 26 August 2025, former Abbott Luang Phor Alongkot was arrested at Wat Phrabatnampu in Lop Buri province on charges of money laundering and fraud.

Influencer Seksan Sapsubbsakul, also known as “Mor Bee", was questioned after revealing he had managed donation accounts at the temple.

In September 2025, it was announced that approximately 200 HIV patients at the temple would be transferred to Thailand's public healthcare system following a decrease in donations in the aftermath of the scandal.
