= Grajewski =

Grajewski (masculine), Grajewska (feminine) is a Polish toponymic surname literally meaning "someone from Grajewo". Notable people with the surname include:

- Andrzej Grajewski (born 1953), Polish political scientist, journalist and publicist
- Mieczysław Grajewski, birth name of Martin Gray, Holocaust survivor and writer
- Wiktor Grajewski, Polish-Jewish journalist, who leaked On the Cult of Personality and Its Consequences to the West
- Monika Grajewska (born 1968), Polish vocalist, music producer, culturologist
