= Pravda Pyat =

Pravda Pyat (Russian: правда пять or Truth Five) is a weekly Russian tabloid news publication that was a spin-off from Pravda. It was founded by Greek entrepreneurs Christos Giannikos and Fyodoros Giannikos of Pravda International in 1996. The magazine replaced Pravda when that publication ceased operations. Its intended audience was younger readers, and coverage was more sensationalistic than Pravda, focusing on crime and scandals.

== See also ==
- Pravda
