= Berkley Books =

Publishing imprint of Penguin Group (USA)

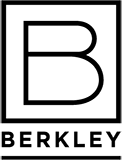
- Parent company: Penguin Group (Penguin Random House)
- Founded: 1955; 71 years ago
- Founder: Charles Byrne and Frederic Klein
- Country of origin: United States
- Headquarters location: New York City
- Imprints: Ace, Jove, New American Library
- Official website: berkleyjoveauthors.com

Berkley Books is an American imprint founded in 1955 by Charles Byrne and Frederic Klein owned by the Penguin Group unit of Penguin Random House.

== History ==
Berkley Books began as an independent company in 1955. It was founded as "Chic News Company" by Charles Byrne and Frederick Klein, who had worked for Avon; they quickly renamed it Berkley Publishing Co. The new name was a coinage, combining elements of their surnames, unrelated to either the philosopher George Berkeley or Berkeley, California. Under their editor-in-chief Thomas Dardis, over the next few years Berkley developed a diverse line of popular fiction and non-fiction, both reprints and mass-market paperback originals, with a particularly strong history in science fiction (books of Robert A. Heinlein and Frank Herbert’s Dune novels, for example). The company was bought in 1965 by G. P. Putnam's Sons and in years to follow undertook a hardcover line under the Berkley imprint, chiefly but not only for science fiction. For example, Merle Miller’s Plain Speaking: An Oral Biography of Harry S. Truman (1973), and The Search for J.F.K. by Joan and Clay Blair Jr. (1976) were substantial nonfiction books under that imprint. When Putnam bought Grosset & Dunlap and Playboy Press, the Jove, Ace and Playboy Press paperback lists were added to that of Berkley; the Playboy list was eventually absorbed into Berkley, while the Jove and Ace lists have continued as distinct imprints.

Following its publication (1985) of the paperback reprint edition of Tom Clancy's The Hunt for Red October, Berkley Books became increasingly interested in publishing military combat fiction and technothrillers; its publicity campaigns at military bases contributed to the success of its reprint edition of Dale Brown's Flight of the Old Dog.[2] The Penguin Group purchased Putnam in 1996. When Penguin merged with Random House in 2013 to form Penguin Random House, Berkley was integrated with the larger paperback line New American Library; the Berkley name was retained for that whole program, which is part of PRH's Penguin Adult group, and publishes in mass-market paperback, trade paperback, and hardcover formats.

In December 2008, Berkley cancelled the publication of the Herman Rosenblat Holocaust memoir titled Angel at the Fence when it was discovered that the book's central events were untrue. In 2011, Berkley Books launched its ebook imprint InterMix. In September 2012, Berkley Books announced that a trilogy of erotic romance novels by Maya Banks had been acquired for publishing. Her trilogy was described as similar to the Fifty Shades trilogy, featuring three billionaires.

In 2015, the sister paperback group New American Library was merged into Berkley. In April 2015, Berkley Books signed the self-published author Jasinda Wilder. In January 2016, Berkley was merged into Penguin's Putnam/Dutton. Ivan Held replaced Leslie Gelbman as president of Berkley Books. In 2020, Berkley Books announced two new horror books by Grady Hendrix.

=== Imprints ===
- Ace Books
- Jove Books
- New American Library

== Authors ==
Its major authors have included:

- Christine Feehan
- Clive Cussler
- Dale Brown
- Dean Koontz
- Frank Herbert
- John Varley
- Mark Greaney
- Nora Roberts
- Patricia Cornwell
- Peter Vronsky
- Robert A. Heinlein
- Susan Meissner
- Tom Clancy
- Vladimir Nabokov

== Comic books ==
- 1976–1977: Bionic Woman PB (Berkley Novel)
- 1977: From the Land Beyond Beyond SC: The Films of Willis O'Brien and Ray Harryhausen
- 1988: New Comics SC
- 1998: X-Men Empire's End PB (Berkley Novel)
