= Candy O'Terry =

American radio personality, singer/songwriter

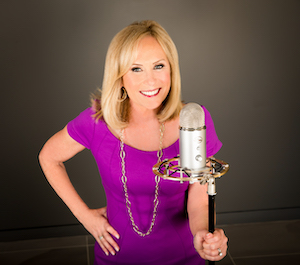
- Photograph by Kerry Brett of Kerry Brett Lifestyles
- Born: Candace Ann Low; New York City
- Occupations: Content Creator, Singer/Songwriter & Speaker Coach
- Website: www.candyoterry.com

Candy O'Terry, also known as Candy O, is a radio broadcaster, podcaster, singer, songwriter, and speaker coach. Chosen by her peers as the Massachusetts Broadcaster of the Year in 2015, she is the recipient of 42 national and 23 local awards for excellence as an interviewer and host. Often referred to as Boston's Beloved Radio Voice she is also the creator of the Candy O Radio Network. As the host of the award-winning podcast series The Story Behind Her Success, O'Terry has interviewed nearly 800 women from every walk of life. The co-founder of Boston Women in Media & Entertainment from 2012 to 2020, she spent 25 years on the air at WMJX, Magic 106.7, and is the creator of the station's signature public affairs program Exceptional Women. O'Terry has been profiled in the book: Boston Inspirational Women by Bill and Kerry Brett. She is also the host of the Nashville-based podcast series Country Music Success Stories and the hands-on communications series The Speaker Coach.

A lifelong singer, O'Terry has recorded 14 songs, receiving worldwide airplay for "The Gift" with Jim Brickman and David Corey, "You Are The Only One", with Charlie Farren, and "Silent Night" with Grace Kelly. She was a member of the cast of the Emmy Award-winning talent show, Community Auditions: Star Of The Day for seven seasons (2007-2015) and made her film debut in 2010 as reporter Candace Malone in the full-length independent feature film CO_{2}. In 2014 she played the role of newscaster Pamela Fontaine in Lazarus Rising, starring Eric Roberts and Lenny Clarke. O'Terry provides narration and plays herself in the 2021 film Misha and the Wolves.

== Personal life and education ==
Born in Manhattan, New York, and originally named Grace Ann Brandhorst, Candy O'Terry was adopted at 5 months old and renamed Candace Ann Low. Her father Raymond was a print advertising sales executive on Lexington, Avenue, and her mother Marjorie was a buyer for Lord & Taylor, Saks Fifth Avenue, and Bonwit Teller. The family relocated to Norwalk, Connecticut, where Candace lived until she was 10 years old. Her parents were divorced when she was 11 after a long custody battle and O'Terry moved with her mother to Newington, Connecticut, where she attended St. Mary's School and Newington High School. She was a champion diver and was recruited by Boston College, where she was a varsity athlete. Her mother died of breast cancer at the age of 52, leaving Candy as the sole beneficiary of her estate at only 18. This personal tragedy would shape Candy's lifelong commitment to the fight against breast cancer. O'Terry graduated from Boston College with a degree cum laude in English. She was married at age 21 and has two children: Christopher, and Colleen. O'Terry was divorced in 1991 and spent 15 years as a single mother until marrying Tom Gaffny in August 2006. She discovered her birth parents, brothers and sisters, and extended family in May 2007.

== Career in radio ==
O'Terry graduated from the Connecticut School of Broadcasting in Wellesley Hills, Massachusetts, in October 1990 and secured an interview on November 2, 1990, at Magic 106.7/Boston for a temporary position as the secretary to a program director, Don Kelley. After serving in that position for 8 weeks, she was officially hired as program assistant and public service director on January 23, 1991.O'Terry landed on the air on July 20, 1991, purely by accident when a part-time disc jockey fell asleep for the third time and was fired. With no one available to work that night, O'Terry did her first overnight shift with coaching from Magic 106.7's Moneen Daley. She worked the overnight shift every weekend for another year, while her children slept in the newsroom. On December 28, 1992, she sent a memo to News Director Gay Vernon about an idea she had for a public affairs program to be called Exceptional Women. The two began a collaboration that lasted until February 2012 when Vernon resigned from the station. The Sunday morning show and O'Terry have received 43 awards, including a record breaking 23 Gracie Allen Awards from the Alliance for Women in Media. In 1993, O'Terry began filling in for midday personality Nancy Quill (homina homina) and also became the afternoon drive traffic anchor for both WMJX Magic 106.7 and sister station, WBCS, Country 96.9 where she took on the alias: Christy Grace.

In 1997, she added traffic duties for 105.7, WROR-FM identifying herself as "Candy O on the Officer Bill Traffic Network" and began a 3-year period working 7-day weeks on multiple stations as a traffic anchor and weekend air talent. The success of the Exceptional Women radio show inspired a yearly celebration called the Exceptional Women Awards in 1998 with a portion of proceeds to benefit the fight against breast cancer.

In 1999, O'Terry was promoted to program administrator of the Greater Boston Radio Group and served temporarily as music director for WROR-FM. In 2001, she was promoted to assistant program director for WMJX Magic 106.7.

In 2004 O'Terry received a Billboard nomination for APD of the Year and a Gracie Allen Award for Individual Achievement as a program host. She would realize the lifelong dream of playing her own songs on the radio between 2005 and 2012 with the recording and release of Jim Brickman's "The Gift" and "Valentine", a duet with Charlie Farren called "You Are The Only One," and a collaboration with jazz prodigy Grace Kelly on the Christmas classic, "Silent Night".

In March 2013 she traded her responsibilities as assistant program director for the chance to be on the air full-time and became the co-host of Morning Magic with The Exciting Mike Addams. In June 2013, Addams announced his retirement, and O'Terry was teamed with a handful of people throughout the summer including David O'Leary, Sue Tabb, Ed McMann, Jaybeau Jones and Chris Shine.

In late August 2013, she was permanently teamed with David O'Leary.

On March 27, 2015, she left, declining a two-year contract renewal with WMJX to focus on other projects, including her first full-length CD called Dream Come True released in May of that year, and a children's book series called Nelson's Garden, co-authored with her daughter Colleen.

== Television ==
- 2004-2006: Co-host of the [isoldmyhouse.com] show with Magic 106.7's Dan Justin
- 2007 to present: Judge on the Emmy Award-winning talent show, Community Auditions "Star Of The Day".
- 2017-2019: Announcer & guest, The Steve Katsos Show

== Film ==
- 2010 Independent Feature Film: CO2 trailer
  Role: Reporter, Candace Malone
- 2013 Independent Feature Film: Lazarus Rising
  Role: Pamela Fontaine
- 2021 Bright Yellow Films: Misha and the Wolves
  Role: herself

O'Terry plays the role of newscaster Candace Malone in the full-length independent feature film, CO_{2}, which premiered October 23, 2010 and was produced by Wild Beagle Productions. In 2014 she played the role of Pamela Fontaine, a newscaster in the film Lazarus Rising, starring Eric Roberts and Lenny Clarke. In 2020, O'Terry was contacted by producers at Bright Yellow Films and asked to recount her Exceptional Women interview from 1997 with Misha DeFonseca for an upcoming project on her life. This project became Misha and the Wolves, a thrilling documentary released on Netflix in 2021 in which O'Terry plays herself and provides narration.

== Career as an Interviewer ==
Candy O'Terry has built her career on storytelling with a mission to provide a platform for women to tell their stories on the radio and through podcasting as the creator and host of Magic 106.7's Exceptional Women Show from 1992 to 2015, The Story Behind Her Success from 2016–present, and Country Music Success Stories, 2020–present. O'Terry has interviewed over 800 women.

Candy O'Terry Top 10 A-lister Interviews

| Name | Show |
|---|---|
| Mariah Carey | Exceptional Women Show, 2001 |
| Naomi Judd | Country Music Success Stories, 2020 |
| Stevie Nicks | Exceptional Women Show, 2004 |
| Gloria Estefan | Exceptional Women Show, 2004 |
| Mary Wilson | Exceptional Women Show, 2005 |
| Crystal Gayle | Country Music Success Stories, 2020 |
| Valerie Harper | Exceptional Women Show, 2002 |
| Lori McKenna | Country Music Success Stories, 2021 |
| Linda Ronstadt | Exceptional Women Show, 1999 |
| Sara Evans | Country Music Success Stories, 2021 |

Candy O'Terry Top 10 Women Who Inspire Interviews

| Name | Show |
|---|---|
| Wendy Booker | Exceptional Women Show, 2005 The Story Behind Her Success, 2018 |
| Nancy Frates | The Story Behind Her Success, 2019 |
| Magi Bish | Exceptional Women Show, 2005 |
| Carolyn Kaelin, MD. | Exceptional Women Show, 2009 |
| Julie Goldman | Exceptional Women Show, 1999 |
| Dottie Lessard | Exceptional Women Show, 2006 |
| Grace Kelly | The Story Behind Her Success, 2019 |
| Lisa Fenn | The Story Behind Her Success, 2019 |
| Jessica Leip | The Story Behind Her Success, 2018 |
| Erica McDermott | The Story Behind Her Success, 2018 |

== Career as a singer ==
O'Terry was lead singer of lead singer of Stage Unlimited from1984 to 1990. She was on Star Search in 1984 and 1987.

In January 2009, "You Are The Only One" is released to radio nationwide and debuts at #34 Mediabase on January 12. The track is supported by the syndicated show Weekends with Jim Brickman.

Over the years she has done dozens of live performances.

=== Singles ===
- 2008 - "You Are The Only One"
- 2017 - "For Good" with Sheree Dunwell
- 2019 - "If I Should Lose My Way" with Jacy Dawn Valeras

== Awards ==
| 2021 | Communicator Award of Distinction, Best Single Episode/Podcast, Country Music Success Stories Communicator Award of Distinction, Best Features Host/Podcast, Country Music Success Stories |
| 2020 | Communicator Award of Excellence, Best Features Host/Podcast, The Story Behind Her Success Communicator Award of Distinction, Special Episode/Podcast, The Story Behind Her Success |
| 2019 | Communicator Award of Excellence, Best Host, The Story Behind Her Success Communicator Award of Distinction, Best Podcast Series, The Story Behind Her Success |
| 2018 | Boston Women, Inc. "Women Amongst Us" Grimke Award City of Boston, Certificate of Recognition as an "exceptional broadcaster" Commonwealth of Massachusetts, Governor Charlie Baker Citation for excellence in broadcast & community service Commonwealth of Massachusetts State Senate, Official Citation for "inspiration to the city of Boston." The Jett Foundation "Beacon Award" |
| 2017 | The Molly Bish Foundation, "Save A Life, Save The World Award" |
| 2015 | Alliance for Women in Media's "Gracie Allen Award" Outstanding Portrait/Biography/Radio, Exceptional Women: "Love Is All Around" Alliance for Women in Media's "Gracie Allen Award" Outstanding Soft News Feature/Radio, Exceptional Women: "Love Is All Around" Massachusetts Broadcasters Association Broadcaster of the Year Award Candy O'Terry, Magic 106.7/WMJX, Boston |
| 2014 | Alliance for Women in Media's "Gracie Allen Award" Outstanding Talk Show-News: Exceptional Women "Grace Under Fire" All 4 One Cancer Foundation "Champion Award" for devotion to the fight against breast cancer. Catholic Academy of Communications Professionals Gabriel Award Single News Story/Local Release: Exceptional Women: "Grace Under Fire" Communicator Award of Excellence, On-Air Talent, Talk Show Candy O'Terry, Host of Exceptional Women Communicator Award of Distinction, Writing & Scripting Candy O'Terry, Creator & Host, Exceptional Women series on 3 women who saved lives after the Boston Marathon bombings called "Grace Under Fire". Massachusetts Broadcasters Association "Sound Bite Awards" Best Feature Story, Exceptional Women: "Grace Under Fire" Strong Women, Strong Girls "Phenomenal Woman Award" |
| 2012 | Chosen to represent Massachusetts as one of 100 Girl Scout Greats by the Girl Scouts of the USA on the 100th Anniversary. Alliance of Women in Media's "Gracie Allen Award" Exceptional Women, Magic 106.7 Public Affairs Program Communicator Award of Excellence, Major Market On-Air Talent Radio Personality Communicator Award of Distinction, On-Air Talent/Talk Show Host Communicator Award of Distinction, Writing & Scripting |
| 2011 | Alliance of Women in Media's "Gracie Allen Award" Best Interview Show, Major Market Radio: Exceptional Women: "Hearts & Hands" |
| 2010 | The Activating Confidence Award from the Women's Sports Foundation American Women in Radio & Television's "Gracie Allen Award" Best Portrait Biography Series/ Major Market Radio: Exceptional Women: "Voices Carry" Outstanding Interview Program or Feature/Major Market Radio: Exceptional Women: "Voices Carry" |
| 2009 | American Women in Radio & Television's "Gracie Allen Award" Outstanding Public Affairs Program/Major Market Radio Series: Exceptional Women: "Think Pink" Outstanding Interview Program/Major Market Radio Series: Exceptional Women: "Think Pink" Communicator Award Best On-Air Talent/Talk Show Host/Candy O'Terry Best Public Affairs Program/Award of Excellence/Exceptional Women |
| 2008 | American Women in Radio & Television's "Gracie Allen Award" Best Public Affairs Program/ Major Market Radio Series: Exceptional Women: "Higher & Higher" Outstanding Interview Program: Exceptional Women: "Higher & Higher" |
| 2007 | American Women in Radio & Television's "Gracie Allen Award" Best Public Affairs Program/Major Market Radio Series: Exceptional Women: "Right On!" Best Portrait/Biography/Major Market Radio Series: Exceptional Women: "Right On!" Boston Women Communicators; Legacy Award: to Candy O'Terry |
| 2006 | American Women in Radio & Television's "Gracie Allen Award" Best Portrait/Biography/Major Market Radio Series: Exceptional Women: "Ain't No Mountain High Enough" American Red Cross Media Hero Award: to Candy O'Terry Ordinary people doing extraordinary things |
| 2005 | American Women in Radio & Television's "Gracie Allen Award" Best Public Affairs Program/Major Market Radio Series: Exceptional Women: "Lost & Found" Communicator Award Best Writing & Creative Concept: Exceptional Women: "Lost & Found" Best Public Affairs Program: Exceptional Women: "Lost & Found" American Red Cross Media Hero Award: to Candy O'Terry Ordinary people doing extraordinary things |
| 2004 | American Women in Radio & Television's "Gracie Allen Award" Outstanding Individual Achievement Award/Major Market to Candy O'Terry Best Portrait/Biography/Major Market Radio Series: Exceptional Women: "No Guts, No Glory" Communicator Award Best Public Affairs Program: Exceptional Women: "No Guts, No Glory" |
| 2003 | American Women in Radio & Television's "Gracie Allen Award" Best Portrait/Biography/Major Market Radio Series: Exceptional Women: "Flying Without Wings" Best Public Affairs Major Market Radio Program: Exceptional Women: "Flying Without Wings" Communicator Award "Crystal Award of Excellence" Best Public Affairs Program Exceptional Women: "Flying Without Wings" |
| 2002 | American Women in Radio & Television's "Gracie Allen Award" Best Portrait/Biography/Major Market Radio Series: Exceptional Women: "Three Voices, Three Stories" Town of Wellesley Special Recognition Awarded to Candy O'Terry Communicator Award Best Writing & Creative Concept: "Exceptional Women: "The Backyard Hero & The Superstar" Best Public Affairs Program Exceptional Women Achievement Award for Excellence in Communications - Massachusetts March of Dimes: awarded to Candy O'Terry |
| 2001 | American Women in Radio & Television's "Gracie Allen Award" Best Public Affairs Program Major Market: Exceptional Women Boston Achievement in Radio Award Best Public Affairs Program: Exceptional Women The Gilda Radner Foundation "Communicator Award" |
| 2000 | American Women in Radio & Television's "Gracie Allen Award" Best Public Affairs Program Major Market Radio: Exceptional Women Massachusetts Broadcasters Association "Star Award" for excellence in public affairs programming: Exceptional Women Boston Achievement in Radio Award Best Public Affairs Program: Exceptional Women Best Station Sponsored Event: Exceptional Women's Awards |
| 1999 | American Women in Radio & Television's "Gracie Allen Award" Grand Award/ Best Major Market Public Affairs Program: Exceptional Women Boston Achievement in Radio Award Best Specialty Show: Exceptional Women Best Public Affairs Program: Exceptional Women |
| 1998 | Boston Achievement in Radio Award Best Public Affairs Program: Exceptional Women American Cancer Society "Special Recognition Award" to Candy O'Terry |

== Philanthropy ==
O'Terry has been involved with several charities and non-profit organizations including American Cancer Society, DreamBIG, empowerHER, The Pink Rose Foundation and Strong Women Strong Girls (Media Spokesperson, event host, 2013–present)

Candy O'Terry is a member by appointment of the Council for Women of Boston College & serves as an ambassador for the Boston College Club.
