= Kenneth Waltzer =

American historian and educator (born 1943)

Kenneth Waltzer Professor Emeritus
- Born: Kenneth Alan Waltzer; New York City
- Occupation: Professor
- Years active: 1971–present
- Known for: research on Buchenwald

Academic background
- Education: Harpur College at Binghamton University
- Alma mater: Harvard University
- Thesis: The American Labor Party : third party politics in New Deal-Cold War New York, 1936-1954 (1977)

Kenneth Alan "Kenny" Waltzer is an American historian and educator, formerly director of the Jewish Studies program at Michigan State University (MSU). His research on the Buchenwald concentration camp has focused on the rescue of children and youths inside the camp and has included some notable findings.

== Background ==
Kenneth Alan Waltzer was born in New York and graduated from Harpur College at Binghamton University. He then earned a PhD in history from Harvard University.

== Career ==
Waltzer has been affiliated with MSU since 1971, when he was appointed to the faculty and went there to help build their residential college in public affairs. During his career, he has served as dean and associate dean of MSU's James Madison College, and as director of MSU's general education program in the arts and humanities. He was awarded a State of Michigan Excellence in Teaching Award in 1990 and MSU's Outstanding Undergraduate Teacher Award in 1998. Waltzer helped build MSU's Jewish Studies and study abroad program in Israel during the 1990s. After a hiatus during the Second Intifada due to security concerns, Waltzer helped persuade MSU to reinstate the study abroad program in Israel in 2006.

== Historical and genealogical research findings ==
Waltzer's Buchenwald-related research at the International Tracing Service determined that Fyodor Michajlitschenko was the young man who rescued Israel Meir Lau from Buchenwald. Michajlitschenko was posthumously awarded Righteous Among the Nations designation by Yad Vashem in 2009.

Waltzer was among the key figures who exposed fabrications in Angel at the Fence, the cancelled Holocaust memoir by Herman Rosenblat. Waltzer's Buchenwald research led him to raise questions about Rosenblat's story of his imprisonment at Schlieben, a sub-camp of Buchenwald. Other witnesses interviewed by Waltzer said Rosenblat's story "couldn’t possibly be true" and was "a figment of his imagination." Waltzer determined that maps of the camp also debunked Rosenblat's claims. Waltzer and his colleagues also determined that Rosenblat's wife and her family were hidden as local townspeople posing as Polish Catholics at a farm near Breslau, some 211 miles away from Schlieben. She could not have been heaving apples daily over the Schlieben camp fence.

Waltzer recently was the historical consultant for Kinderblock 66, a documentary about Buchenwald's kinderblock 66 and about the efforts of Czech Communist Antonin Kalina, part of the camp underground, to protect imprisoned children. Antonin Kalina was granted Righteous Among the Nations status by Yad Vashem posthumously in 2012 and the announcement was made as Kinderblock 66 played at the Jerusalem Film Festival.
