= Laurie B. Friedman =

American writer

Laurie B. Friedman (born 1964) is an American author.

Friedman is best known for the Mallory McDonald chapter book series for 7–10-year olds, published by Darby Creek, a division of Lerner Publishing Group. She has also written Ruby Valentine Saves the Day, I'm Not Afraid of this Haunted House, and Back-to-School Rules. In 2013, she was to release a new journal-format series for older readers entitled The Mostly Miserable Life of April Sinclair.

== Mallory McDonald Books ==
1. Mallory on the Move (2004)
2. Back to School, Mallory (2004)
3. Mallory vs. Max (2005)
4. Happy Birthday, Mallory! (2005)
5. In Business with Mallory (2006)
6. Heart to Heart with Mallory (2006)
7. Mallory on Board (2007)
8. Honestly, Mallory! (2007)
9. Campfire Mallory (2008)
10. Step Fourth, Mallory! (2008)
11. Red, White & True Blue Mallory (2009)
12. Happy New Year, Mallory! (2009)
13. Mallory Goes Green! (2010)
14. Mallory in the Spotlight (2010)
15. Mallory's Guide to Boys, Brothers, Dads and Dogs (2011)
16. Mallory's Super Sleepover (2011)
17. Oh Boy, Mallory (2012)
18. Mallory McDonald, Super Snoop (2012)
19. Mallory and Mary Ann Take New York (2013)
20. Play It Again, Mallory (2013)
21. Three's company, Mallory! (2014)
22. Mallory McDonald, Baby Expert (2014)
23. Game Time, Mallory! (2015)
24. Change Is in the Air, Mallory (2015)
25. On the Road with Mallory (2016)
26. High Five, Mallory! (2016)
27. Mallory McDonald, Super Sitter (2017)
28. Mallory Makes a Difference (2017)

== Other books ==
- Angel girl (2008), Carolrhoda Books, ISBN 978-0822-58739-2
