= Herman Rosenblat =

Polish-born American author (1929–2015)

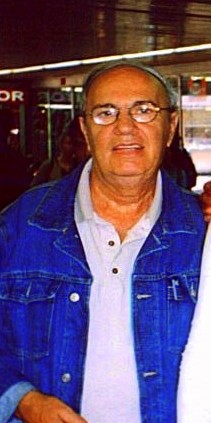
- Born: 23 September 1929; Poland
- Died: 5 February 2015 (aged 85); Florida, United States
- Spouse: Roma Radzicki (m. 1957)

Herman A. Rosenblat (23 September 1929 – 5 February 2015) was a Polish-born Holocaust survivor and American author, known for writing a fictitious Holocaust memoir titled Angel at the Fence, purporting to tell the story of a girl who passed him food through the barbed-wire fence at the Schlieben sub-camp of the Buchenwald concentration camp in World War II. The book was planned to be published in 2009 by Berkley Books, but was cancelled after it turned out that many elements of his memoir were fabricated and some were contrary to verifiable historical facts. Rosenblat later admitted to lying on purpose with the intention of "bringing joy".

Before the hoax became public, the film rights to the book were purchased for $25 million by Harris Salomon of Atlantic Overseas Pictures. Other fans of the story include Oprah Winfrey who has described it as the single greatest love story she heard in over 22 years of hosting her show.

The story behind Rosenblat's story is being developed as an independent feature film. In June 2010 Atlantic Overseas Pictures and producer Harris Salomon signed a co-production agreement with Castel Film Studios, a well known studio in Central and Eastern Europe and the studio for Cold Mountain and Borat as well as 3rd-i films in London, to produce a feature film about the Herman Rosenblat affair based on an original screenplay by award-winning screenwriter Ivo Marloh entitled The Apple, scheduled for production in 2015. As of 2025, no such film has been released or announced as being in production by any known source.

== Life ==
Rosenblat, a Polish Jew, lived in the town of Piotrków Trybunalski before World War II. Following the invasion of Poland, the Nazis rounded up his family in 1939 along with thousands of others when the Piotrków Trybunalski Ghetto was set up. His father had previously died of typhus. Two years later, when Rosenblat was 12 years old, his mother was separated from him and put on a Holocaust train to Treblinka extermination camp during one of the ghetto liquidation actions. About 90% of the inhabitants of the ghetto were sent to Majdanek and Treblinka death camps. He later wrote that he lied to the Germans about his age because the Nazis used older boys for slave labor, and sent younger ones for extermination. In July 1944, with the front lines approaching, he was deported with his three older brothers to Schlieben sub-camp of the Buchenwald concentration camp, until February 1945. He claimed in his memoir that his future wife Roma, a nine-year-old Jewish girl hiding in the town of Schlieben with her family, threw him apples and bread over the electrified, guarded fence of the camp on a daily basis throughout the seven months' period.

Shortly before liberation he was brought to the Theresienstadt camp. After being liberated from the concentration camps, Rosenblat and his brothers were brought to the UK in a group of 730 orphans to start a new life. Rosenblat says he lived in London for four years, where he learned the electrical trade at the Organization for Rehabilitation through Training school. He then moved to the United States in 1950 and was drafted into the United States Army in 1951. After serving for two years, he says he moved to New York and opened his own TV repair shop in Brooklyn. He met Roma Radzicki in the United States on a blind date in 1957, and married her. He later claimed that during the date he had recognized her as the girl who threw apples to him over the fence and proposed on the spot.

== Hoax ==
=== Invention and rise to fame ===
In 1992 Rosenblat and his wife had run into serious financial problems after the Rosenblat family were victims of an armed robbery that left his son, Kenneth Rosenblat, in a wheelchair and left Rosenblat critically injured. Rosenblat invented the story in the hospital while recovering. Rosenblat stated that his mother had appeared to him at the hospital and had told him to tell his story to the world. In 1994 Rosenblat had a tax lien placed on him by the IRS for unpaid payroll taxes dating back to 1988, which must have increased the financial pressure on him. According to Holocaust historian Kenneth Waltzer, Rosenblat changed his own story, replacing it with the love story, and then it must have become difficult to turn back. After he had won Winfrey's contest of love stories he maintained the lie.

Rosenblat told the apple story for the first time in late 1995, and he won Winfrey's contest in 1996. Oprah Winfrey interviewed Rosenblat in two different programs, in 1996 and 2007, and she called his story "the single greatest love story, in 22 years of doing this show, we’ve ever told on the air."

Berkley Books, an imprint of the Penguin Group, signed Rosenblat up to publish his memoir Angel at the Fence, with Andrea Hurst working as Rosenblat's literary agent. Producer Harris Salomon, of Atlantic Overseas Pictures, made plans to adapt the story into a $25 million movie called The Flower at the Fence, and he had earlier registered a screenplay based on the story with the Library of Congress in 2003.

=== Discovery of hoax ===
Jewish professor Deborah Lipstadt had already denounced the story in her personal blog in December 2007. Other Holocaust survivors like Peter Kubicek also denounced the implausibility of the story. Jewish-American blogger Danny Bloom started emailing several historians for help, one of them being Holocaust historian Kenneth Waltzer.

Waltzer had been interviewing survivors for a new book, and he had been told that the story was probably false. In November 2008 Waltzer contacted forensic genealogists Sharon Sergeant and Colleen Fitzpatrick and started investigating the matter. He found out that the prisoners of that concentration camp were prohibited from approaching a camp's fence on pain of death, nor was anyone allowed to approach a fence from the outside. Such perimeter fences were electrified and watched 24/7 by armed guards stationed on guard towers, ready to shoot anyone who approached the fence from either side. The SS barracks were near to the only fence that faced outwards, and prisoners approaching the barracks would have been shot. Waltzer also discovered that Herman's future wife Roma was never in the town of Schlieben, but that she lived throughout that period in a German farm 210 miles (340 km) away, near Breslau. Another survivor of the same camp, Ben Helfgott, told him that Rosenblat had never told the story before the mid-1990s. Waltzer started questioning the publisher and the agent about the authenticity of the story, with little success. Some people actively resisted and tried to shut down his investigation.

On December 25 and 26, 2008, several scholars and family members published multiple critical articles in The New Republic, the first article using Waltzer's research, and the second adding their own research on top of Waltzer's. On December 27 Rosenblat finally confessed the truth to the producer of his movie, Harris Solomon, and his literary agent, Andrea Hurst. He stated that the apple-tossing part of his backstory was something he only imagined, while stating that the rest of his Holocaust experiences were accurate, however other falsehoods and discrepancies in his remaining story have been discovered since then. Rosenblat has not apologized, and claimed that "It was my imagination, and in my mind, I believed it. Even now, I believe it.", and he also said that he did it to bring happiness and hope to people.

His family knew about the hoax and tried to convince Rosenblat not to tell it. This caused a division in Rosenblat's family. His last surviving brother, Sam, had hesitated talking to him and he died in 2007. Herman's two children were very uncomfortable with the matter. Despite not agreeing with Rosenblat, the family never revealed the truth to the media or Rosenblat's publishers or producers. The other orphans from Buchenwald knew that the story was very implausible but decided not to say anything. As time passed, the persons knowing about the hoax grew more uncomfortable about keeping silent about it and there was a growing consensus that the truth had to be told.

=== Reaction to discovery ===
On December 27, 2008, the same day of Rosenblat's confession, Berkley Group cancelled the book publication, saying that it had received "new information" from Rosenblat's agent. A spokesman said that they would be asking for the money back that they had advanced, and the company has declined making any more comments on the matter. A children's edition of the book, written by a third party, Laurie Friedman of Miami, titled Angel Girl, had been released in September 2008. When Lerner Books learned that the book was based on Rosenblat's falsehoods they said that they wouldn't make any reprint and that they would refund any returned copy. About 2,000 copies were sold.

Producer Harris Salomon wasn't aware of Rosenblat's hoax when he started working on his movie of the Rosenblat story, but still intends to produce it, as he had always planned a "loose and fictionalised adaptation" and "the story retains its power to grip audiences worldwide." He had been working with Rosenblat over a six-year period as the original feature film was being developed. According to Salomon, the script for the feature was completed in October 2009 with casting to commence by Celestia Fox in London. Producers Abi Sirokh, Gabor Koltai, Lew Rywin and Thierry Potok contributed to the project. The new motion picture tells the story of Herman Rosenblat, with a style similar to the film The Insider. After the revelation of the hoax, the focus of the film was changed to a psychological love story examining why a Holocaust survivor would make up a story about the Holocaust and the love for his wife while driven by greed, fame and the memory of the Holocaust. Salomon has asked Rosenblat to donate all the earnings of the film to Holocaust survivor charities but Rosenblat refused.

Winfrey posted a disclaimer on her website, and in February 2009, she said that she was "disappointed", but she denied having been duped by Rosenblat and that she was "minding my own business." Gayle King, a friend of Winfrey's, pointed out that a lot of other people had also been duped and claimed that she was being scapegoated.

In July 2009, the website Gawker reported on a new video released by Rosenblat via YouTube. The video features Rosenblat describing and re-enacting his Holocaust love story for the producers of the film adaptation of his book, specifically the throwing of apples over the perimeter fence of the Buchenwald Concentration Camp, long after that part of his story had been discredited as fake.

On September 1, 2009, York House Press published a paperback book titled The Apple, written by Penelope Holt. It tells Rosenblat's life story. Peter Kubicek, an outspoken critic of the original book, reportedly advised the author and is thanked in the preface of the book.

=== Analysis and repercussions ===
Holocaust historian Kenneth Waltzer said that it was disturbing that so few people had noticed and inquired about the obvious holes in his history over a decade. Waltzer and others have said that Rosenblat did not need to embellish his story, which was already powerful enough by itself. Waltzer places part of the blame in all those "culture makers" that profited from the diffusion of the story and never doubted even the most implausible parts of it. It appears that the veracity of story was not questioned either by the book publisher or by Oprah Winfrey, and that no fact-checking was done to ensure the authenticity of the memoir prior to endorsing it soundly.

Deborah Lipstadt and others have harshly criticized Rosenblat for embellishing his story, since this could cause people to doubt the truth of the Holocaust, and encourage Holocaust deniers.

According to Fitzpatrick, one of Waltzer's collaborators, such hoaxes could be avoided if the publishers spent a few thousand dollars in early fact-checking with historians and genealogists, before deciding to spend huge sums of money for the story.

Among a number of other false elements in Rosenblat's story, he claimed that he was scheduled to be gassed at 10am on May 10, 1945, and that the liberation saved him by just two hours. The war ended officially on May 8, and the entire camp had been handed over to the International Red Cross a week earlier. Theresienstadt had no gas chambers and, as noted by Deborah Lipstadt: "Jewish prisoners were not told ahead of time that they were going to be gassed."

== See also ==
- Misery literature
- Martin Grey (Au nom de tous les miens)
- Binjamin Wilkomirski (Fragments: Memories of a Wartime Childhood, 1995)
- Rosemarie Pence (Hannah: From Dachau to the Olympics and Beyond, 2005)
- Enric Marco (Memorias del infierno, 1978)
- Donald J. Watt (Stoker, 1995)
- Denis Avey (The Man who Broke into Auschwitz, 2011)
- James Frey (A Million Little Pieces, 2003)
