= Stefan Maechler =

Swiss historian

Stefan Mächler
- Born: 30 May 1957 (age 69); Baden, Switzerland
- Occupations: Historian, author
- Writing career
- Genre: Modern history
- Notable work: Der Fall Wilkomirski

Stefan Maechler (born 30 May 1957) is a Swiss historian and expert on antisemitism and Switzerland's treatment of Holocaust refugees during and after World War II.

== Biography ==
=== Education ===
Mächler was born on 30 May 1957 in Baden, Switzerland. He studied history and German literature at the University of Zurich.

=== Wilkomirski affair ===
He was commissioned by Schocken Books, a publisher specializing in Judaica, to conduct a full-scale investigation into the life of writer Binjamin Wilkomirski, whose memoir Fragments, published by Schocken in 1996, sparked international controversy. Maechler studied hundreds of personal documents, and interviewed eyewitnesses and families of survivors in seven countries. He was given unrestricted access to government files, and discovered facts that completely refuted Wilkomirski's bestselling book as a forgery. Maechler's findings were published in a book called The Wilkomirski Affair: A Study in Biographical Truth by Schocken Books, New York, in 2001 (496 pp.); the original German title was Der Fall Wilkomirski: über die Wahrheit einer Biographie, published by Pendo Verlag AG, Zurich, 2000.

=== Personal life ===
Maechler lives and works in Zürich.
