= The Mascot (book) =

2007 book by Mark Kurzem

- Author: Mark Kurzem
- Genre: Holocaust memoir
- Published: 2007
- Publisher: Penguin Books

The Mascot is a 2007 memoir by Mark Kurzem about his father Alex Kurzem, a Belorussian Holocaust survivor. It was published by Penguin Books.

== Overview ==
The book covers Alex and Mark Kurzem's findings about his past. Alex Kurzem had fled his town during a Nazi perpetrated massacre of Jews in 1942. He was discovered by a Latvian police Schutzmannschaft battalion and adopted as their child mascot under an assumed identity.

== Reception and controversy ==
The book received positive reviews at the time of its publication. Kurzem's claims were viewed with skepticism by some until a 2021 DNA test confirmed his origin.
