= Hannah: From Dachau to the Olympics and Beyond =

Fake Holocaust biography by Jean Goodwin Messinger

- Front cover for the Hannah: From Dachau to the Olympics and Beyond written about Hannah Pence.
- Author: Jean Goodwin Messinger
- Language: English
- Subject: Hannah Pence
- Genre: Holocaust biography
- Publisher: White Pelican Press
- Publication date: August 2, 2005
- Publication place: United States
- ISBN: 978-0615128665

Hannah: From Dachau to the Olympics and Beyond is a falsified Holocaust biography written by Jean Goodwin Messinger about Hannah Pence. The book gained notoriety when it was revealed that the entire story had been fabricated by Pence.

== Claims ==
Pence claims that during World War II, at the age of three, she was taken from her family of German Jews by the Nazis. She was forced into the Dachau concentration camp, where medical experiments were performed upon her and she was starved by the guards. After being rescued from the camp by American forces, she went on to live in a convent whose nuns taught her to ski. The Denver Post wrote that after the convent, "She claimed to have competed on Germany’s 1956 Olympic ski team. Then came a stint on a kibbutz in Israel. And a heroic battle for real estate she said Germany rightly owed her. And a marriage to a U.S. pilot who, she said, later went missing in Vietnam. Oh, and a scare during the 1972 Olympics, an audience with the pope, an encounter with Ronald Reagan at the Berlin Wall and an airplane hijacking by a Palestinian terrorist."

== Aftermath ==
The story began to unravel in the summer of 2009 when Pence was baptized by Texas evangelical Beth Moore. The congregation and others in the town took issue with some of the claims in the book, which led to Messinger admitting that she had not checked on any of the claims Pence had made "because, to me, that would have felt sneaky." After it was revealed that the entirety of Pence's story was a fabrication, Messinger stated, "I was terribly embarrassed. Not only for me, but for everyone else touched by this." Pence's real life ex-husband, from whom she was estranged, confirmed to the media that none of her stories were true.

== See also ==
- Angel at the Fence by Herman Rosenblat
- The Man who Broke into Auschwitz by Denis Avey
- Misery literature
- Misha Defonseca
