= Sharon Sergeant =

American forensic genealogist (born 1947)

Sharon Sergeant is an American forensic genealogist who specializes in researching and tracing international fraud cases, property settlements, and provenance of artifact collections. She also conducts biographical research for historians, publishers, authors, and journalists. Sergeant attended Northeastern University and received a bachelor's degree from Boston University. She lives in Waltham, Massachusetts.

She was involved in exposing two high-profile literary frauds in 2008, Misha Defonseca and Herman Rosenblat.

== Cases ==
Sergeant and Colleen Fitzpatrick led the team that exposed Misha Defonseca's bestselling book Misha: A Mémoire of the Holocaust Years as a hoax.

She also worked with the team that exposed Herman Rosenblat's book, Angel at the Fence, as a fraudulent account of his time as a concentration camp survivor.
