= Keith Moor =

Australian journalist

Keith Moor is a journalist, raised in Newcastle upon Tyne with a long career with the newspaper The Herald and its successor, the Herald Sun.

During his long career with The Herald and Weekly Times, Moor covered the search for justice for the victims of Mr. Cruel and for the murdered schoolgirl Kylie Maybury.
