= Misha: A Mémoire of the Holocaust Years =

Literary hoax

- Author: Misha Defonseca (Monique de Wael)
- Language: English
- Genre: World War II, The Holocaust, Literary hoax
- Publisher: Mt. Ivy Press
- Publication date: 1997
- Publication place: United States
- Pages: 247
- ISBN: 978-0-9635257-7-2
- Dewey Decimal: 940.53/18/09493
- LC Class: PS3554.E367 M57 1997

Misha: A Mémoire of the Holocaust Years is a literary hoax by Misha Defonseca, first published in 1997. The book was published as a memoir telling the claimed true story of how the author survived the Holocaust as a young Jewish girl, wandering Europe searching for her deported parents. The book sold well in several countries and was made into a film, Survivre avec les loups (Surviving with the Wolves), named after the claim that Misha was adopted by a pack of wolves during her journey who protected her.

However, on 29 February 2008, Defonseca publicly admitted what many had already suspected, that her book was false. Her real name was Monique de Wael; while her parents had been taken away by the Nazis, they were not Jews but Roman Catholic members of the Belgian Resistance. She also did not leave her home during the war, as the book claims. In a statement released through her lawyers to the Brussels newspaper Le Soir, de Wael attempted to defend the hoax, claiming that the story of "Misha" "is not actual reality, but was my reality, my way of surviving" and that there were moments when she "found it difficult to differentiate between what was real and what was part of my imagination."

== Monique de Wael ==
It is difficult to be sure of de Wael's true history, since it was obscured for so long behind the falsehood she told. A fragmentary version can be put together from documentation turned up by researchers and from de Wael's own admissions.

Monique de Wael was born in 1937 in Etterbeek, Belgium, to Robert De Wael and Josephine Donvil. Sources differ as to her birthdate: 12 May (according to a baptismal record) or 2 September (according to records from the school Monique attended in the year 1943–44). Her family was Catholic, and her parents were members of the Belgian resistance, which led to them being arrested by the Nazis on 23 September, 1941. Nazi records indicate that Robert de Wael was executed on May 3 or 4 of 1944, and Donvil died sometime between 1 February and 31 December 1945.

According to de Wael's February 2008 statement, her guardianship went first to her grandfather Ernest de Wael, and then to her uncle Maurice de Wael. De Wael says that with the exception of her grandfather, those who took her in treated her badly, including calling her "the traitor's daughter" because her father was suspected of having given information under torture in St. Gilles prison. She remained with her uncle's family, and did not go off in search of her missing parents as "Misha" did, but according to her statement, this time with her uncle's family was when she began to "feel Jewish" and to fantasise about running off with the wolves.

== The book ==
By the late 1980s, de Wael was living in Massachusetts in the United States under the name Misha Defonseca. She was telling people the fictional story of Misha as a recollection of her own life, and presented it to the congregation of a Holliston, Massachusetts, synagogue on Holocaust Memorial Day as her own experience of the Holocaust.

The character of Misha is eight when her parents are taken away (unlike de Wael, who was four). Before their deportation, her parents placed her with a Roman Catholic family, who give her the pseudonym Monique de Wael (the author's real name). When this family treats her cruelly, Misha goes off in search of her parents, walking through Europe and living by stealing food, clothing and shoes.

At a time when she faces starvation in a forest, she is adopted by wolves, becoming a feral child. Protected by the pack, she survives by eating offal and worms. All in all, she treks over 1,900 miles (3,100 kilometers) through Europe, from Belgium to Ukraine, through the Balkans and Germany and Poland (where she sneaks in and out of the Warsaw Ghetto), to Italy by boat and back to Belgium through France. Before the war is over, the character has taken human life to survive, stabbing to death with a pocket knife a rapist Nazi soldier who attacks her.

When Jane Daniel, the owner of a small publishing company, Mt. Ivy Press, heard of Misha's dramatic and supposedly true story, she signed Defonseca to write a memoir of her experiences, with Vera Lee, a friend of Daniel's, as co-writer. The book was published in April 1997, and sold only around 5,000 copies in the United States, but was optioned for a film by The Walt Disney Company. Disney declined to make the film, however, in part because of legal difficulties: by 1998, Defonseca and Lee had brought a lawsuit against Daniel, alleging that she had failed to market the book properly in the U.S. and had failed to give the co-authors their proper share of overseas royalties. In 2001 a jury awarded Defonseca and Lee over $10 million. A judge's decision later tripled the amount Daniel was required to pay to over $32 million, with $22.5 million to go to Defonseca and $11 million to Lee. The rights to the book were also awarded to Defonseca.

Defonseca's contract with Daniel and Mt. Ivy Press did not include the European print and film rights, which were sold separately. The book became a bestseller in France, selling more than 30,000 copies, and Defonseca toured France to promote it; in Italy the book sold even better, surpassing 37,000 copies. French film rights were sold to French Jewish filmmaker Véra Belmont and the resulting film, Survivre avec des loups, opened in Belgium in late 2007.

== Exposure ==
Doubts about the truthfulness of the book surfaced even before the book was published. At least two people who were asked by the publisher to contribute blurbs for the book instead warned the publisher that the story was not true. One of them, Lawrence L. Langer (a 1991 winner of the National Book Critics Circle Award for Criticism, for his book Holocaust Testimonies: The Ruins of Memory) consulted Holocaust scholar Raul Hilberg, who also thought the story impossible. A third, Bette Greene, asked for her blurb to be removed because she found the book unbelievable. As early as 1996, questions of authenticity were being aired publicly, for instance by Henryk M. Broder in Der Spiegel: "Falsehood or not a falsehood, that is the question here. Aside from [the existence of a compass allegedly used by Misha] no objective proof exists. And all witnesses who could confirm Misha's story are either dead or disappeared."

Even Defonseca's co-author Lee had doubts, leading her to consult Facing History and Ourselves, a nonprofit educational organization which helps to guide how the Holocaust is studied in schools. According to Lee, when the organization's representative told her that the story she was describing was impossible, she tried to bring her concerns to Daniel, only to be rebuffed. When she was told that Defonseca had burned diaries from her teens in which she had written down her story, because the French version of her book had told her story so completely, Lee was surprised because she had never been told of the existence of these diaries, much less been given access to them to assist in writing the book. Nevertheless, Lee would profess surprise in 2008 when Defonseca confessed that she was not Jewish and the story was fictional, saying that no research she did had led her to think the story was anything but true.

As the publisher of the book, Daniel had made many public statements which addressed the issue of whether Defonseca's memoir was truthful. One of these public statements came in 1999, and was prompted by the public controversy that occurred when Binjamin Wilkomirski's alleged Holocaust memoir Fragments: Memories of a Wartime Childhood 1939–1948 was shown to be a fraud. Daniel wrote "Is Misha's story fact or invention? Without hard evidence one way or the other, questions will always remain ... It is left to the reader to decide." Later, after the first jury award, Daniel would say "I have no idea whether [Misha's story] is true or not. My experience is that all Holocaust stories are far-fetched. All survivor stories are miracles." By 2007, however, Daniel was trying to actively debunk the story of Misha in hopes that it would provide a way to challenge the judgement against her. In August 2007, Daniel began a blog titled "Best-Seller", telling the story of how the book came to be published, and attracted attention from Sharon Sergeant, a genealogist. Using clues from the various versions of the manuscript, including the "pseudonym" of Monique de Wael, Sergeant turned up documents from de Wael's life, such as a baptismal record and a school register showing de Wael enrolled in elementary school in 1943 when Misha was supposed to be wandering through Europe. After Daniel published these documents on the blog in late February 2008, the Belgian newspaper Le Soir took up the controversy, unearthing and publishing more detail on de Wael's parents. Within a week, Defonseca had acknowledged that Monique de Wael was her real name and that the life of Misha was a fantasy.

Misha and the Wolves is a 2021 documentary film written and directed by Sam Hobkinson that examines the memoir and its exposure as a fraudulent narrative.

== See also ==
- The Painted Bird by Jerzy Kosinski
- Angel at the Fence by Herman Rosenblat
- Benjamin Wilkomirski (Fragments)
- Rosemarie Pence (Hannah: From Dachau to the Olympics and Beyond)
- Dog Boy by Eva Sallis was inspired by the story of feral child Ivan Mishukov
