= Enric Marco =

Spanish impostor (1921–2022)

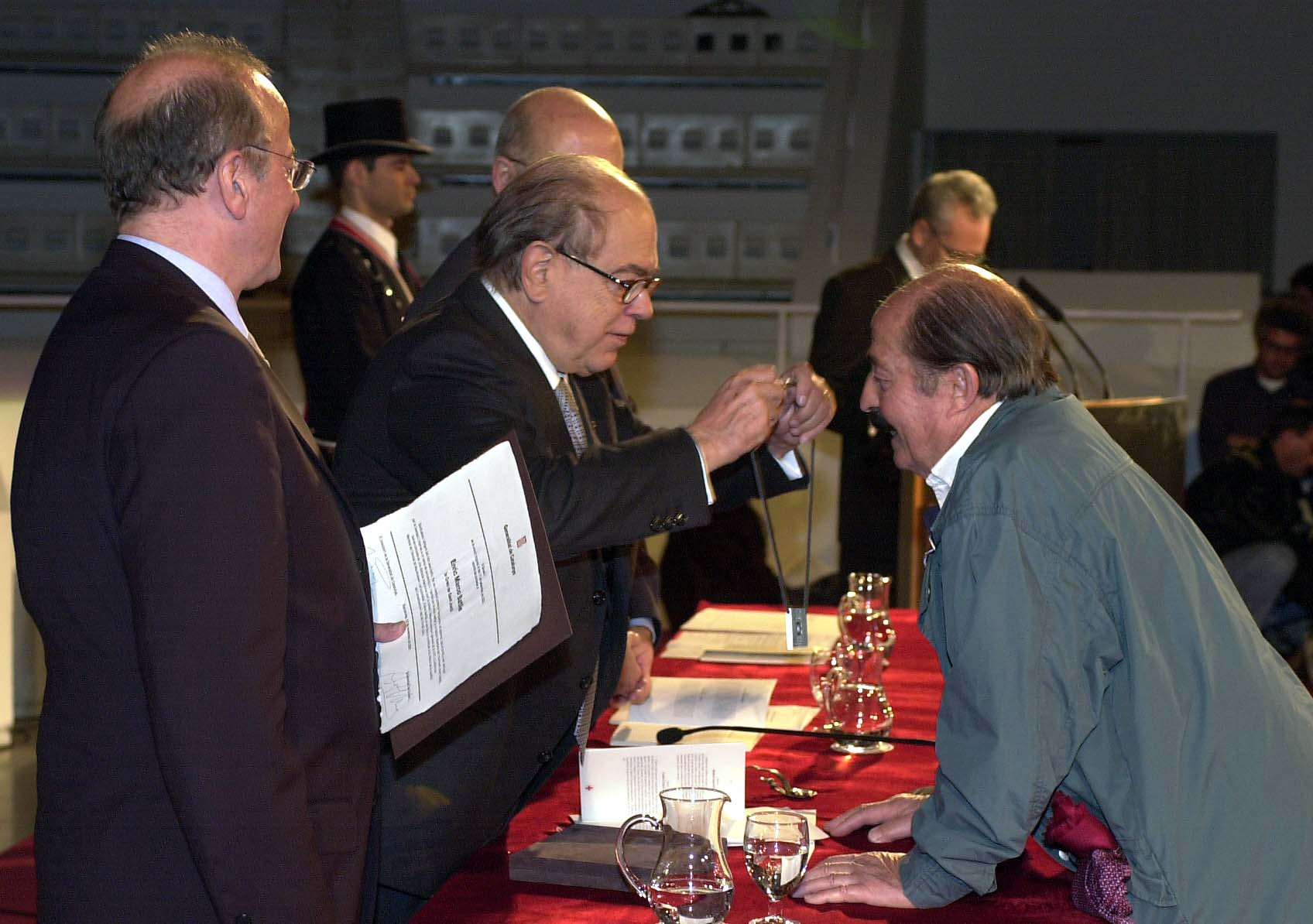
- Marco (right) receiving the Creu de Sant Jordi from Jordi Pujol

President of the Amical de Mauthausen
- In office 2003–2005
- Preceded by: Joan Escuer
- Succeeded by: Rosa Toran Belver

General Secretary of the National Confederation of Labour
- In office April 1978 – December 1979
- Preceded by: Juan Gómez Casas
- Succeeded by: José Bondía

Personal details
- Born: Enric Marco Batlle; 12 April 1921 Barcelona, Catalonia, Spain
- Died: 21 May 2022 (aged 101)
- Known for: False claims of being a Holocaust survivor
- Awards: Creu de Sant Jordi (revoked in 2005)

Enric Marco Batlle (12 April 1921 – 21 May 2022) was a Catalan impostor and former trade unionist who claimed to have been imprisoned by Nazi Germany in the Flossenbürg concentration camp during World War II. Born in Barcelona, Marco had volunteered to go to Germany as a foreign worker and was never interned in a concentration camp. Following the Spanish transition to democracy, after a brief time serving as the general secretary of the National Confederation of Labour (CNT), Marco gained recognition for his stories of surviving the Holocaust. He was awarded the Creu de Sant Jordi by the Catalan government and became president of the Amical de Mauthausen, an organisation of Spanish victims of Nazism. In 2005, he was exposed as an impostor and forced to resign his post and renounce his awards. Marco remained unrepentant for his actions, justifying them as necessary to preserve the collective memory of the Holocaust, although he was widely criticised by Spanish Holocaust survivors.

== Biography ==
=== Early life ===
Enric Marco Batlle was born in the Catalan capital of Barcelona on 12 April 1921, although Marco himself later claimed his birthday to have been on 14 April, which would have had him born 10 years before the proclamation of the Second Spanish Republic. From the moment of Marco's birth, his mother was confined to a mental asylum. Marco claimed to have joined the Spanish anarchist movement at a young age. Following the outbreak of World War II, in 1941, Marco volunteered to emigrate to Nazi Germany as a foreign worker, as part of an agreement between Germany and Francoist Spain. He was briefly imprisoned in Kiel, but unlike a number of other foreign workers in Germany at the time, he was never sent to a concentration camp.

Following the Spanish transition to democracy, in 1978, Marco was elected as general secretary of the National Confederation of Labour (CNT), an anarchist trade union confederation which was legalised following the death of Francisco Franco. As general secretary, Marco led a general strike against the Moncloa Pacts, during which the CNT shut down petrol stations throughout the province of Barcelona. For his role in the strikes, Spanish police arrested and tortured him. Only two years later, he was expelled from the CNT.

=== Claims to Nazi concentration camp survival ===
In the late 1970s, Marco began claiming to have been a Spanish victim of Nazi Germany and a survivor of the Flossenbürg concentration camp. Marco claimed that he fled his home city ahead of the fall of Barcelona and sought refuge in France, where he claimed he was arrested by the Nazi occupiers and transferred to camp Flossenbürg in Bavaria. He was featured in a book about Spanish prisoners of the Nazi concentration camps, written by historian Eduard Pons Prades and Holocaust survivor Mariano Constante, in which he claimed to be the only Spanish prisoner interned in Flossenbürg.

By the turn of the 21st century, Marco was receiving widespread recognition for his claimed survival of Nazism. In 2001, Marco was awarded the Creu de Sant Jordi by the Catalan government of Jordi Pujol. In 2003, he was elected as president of the Amical de Mauthausen and regularly gave emotional speeches in which he told stories about his experiences in Flossenbürg. On International Holocaust Remembrance Day of 2005, he addressed the Congress of Deputies and enthralled a number of parliamentarians with his speech.

=== Exposure as an impostor ===
By 2005, people were increasingly questioning the authenticity of Marco's stories. Neus Català, a survivor of the Ravensbrück concentration camp, publicly expressed doubts about his story in interviews with journalists. Spanish historian Benito Bermejo began investigating Marco's story, having found that the details often changed when Marco recounted his supposed experiences. After an investigation into the archives of the Ministry of Foreign Affairs, Bermejo discovered that Marco, contrary to his claims, had volunteered to go to Germany and had neither been deported nor incarcerated in a concentration camp. He attempted to elicit an explanation from Marco, but failed to get one after months of trying.

Bermejo decided to send his report to the Amical de Mauthausen association and the office of the prime minister of Spain, José Luis Rodríguez Zapatero, who was due to attend a commemoration at Mauthausen alongside Marco. Before the event took place, Marco was confronted by members of the Amical association, forcing him to admit to his deception and return to Barcelona without attending. Marco publicly admitted to having been an impostor, resigned the presidency of the Amical association in disgrace, and returned his Creu de Sant Jordi.

Marco never apologised for lying about his internment, arguing that his aim had been to help preserve the memory of the Spanish victims of Nazism. But the Amical association and genuine Spanish survivors of Nazi concentration camps argued that he had damaged their work to preserve the collective memory of the camps and even accused him of fueling Holocaust denial.

=== Later life and cultural depictions ===
In 2009, Marco was the subject of the documentary Ich bin Enric Marco, in which the filmmakers took him on a journey back through Germany, where he continued to take credit for raising awareness of the Spanish victims of Nazism.

In 2014, Javier Cercas published his book about Marco, The Impostor, which recounts his rise and fall as a public figure. Cercas compared Marco to Don Quixote, criticising his fraud while also celebrating him as a hero. In a quoted passage in the book, Mario Vargas Llosa also compared Marco with Don Quixote, although he said that unlike the subject of the book, "a novelist has an artistic license to lie."

Enric Marco died on 21 May 2022. After his death, in 2024, he was the subject of the biographical thriller film Marco, the Invented Truth.

== Selected works ==
- Memorias del infierno (1978)

== See also ==
- Misery literature
- Misha Defonseca
- Martin Grey
- Herman Rosenblat
- Rosemarie Pence
- Binjamin Wilkomirski

== Bibliography ==
- Badcock, James (5 May 2015). "How Spanish Nazi victim Enric Marco was exposed as impostor". BBC News.
- Brenneis, Sara J. (2018). "The death of historical memory? Javier Cercas's El impostor versus the legacy of Spaniards deported to Nazi camps". Journal of Spanish Cultural Studies. 19 (3): 365–381. doi:10.1080/14636204.2018.1507173.
- Cid, Rafael (25 June 2022). "Enric Marco: In Memóriam". Rojo y Negro (in Spanish).
- McLennan, Callum (7 September 2024). "A Master of Deception: 'Marco, The Invented Truth' Explores the Life of a False Concentration Camp Survivor". Variety.
- Russell, Matthew (2010). "The Holocaust as trope in post-Franco Spain: historical memory and the case of Enric Marco". Vanderbilt e-Journal of Luso-Hispanic Studies. 6: 101–117. doi:10.15695/vejlhs.v6i0.3255. ISSN 1547-5743.
