= Martin Gray (writer) =

Polish writer and Holocaust survivor (1922–2016)

Martin Gray

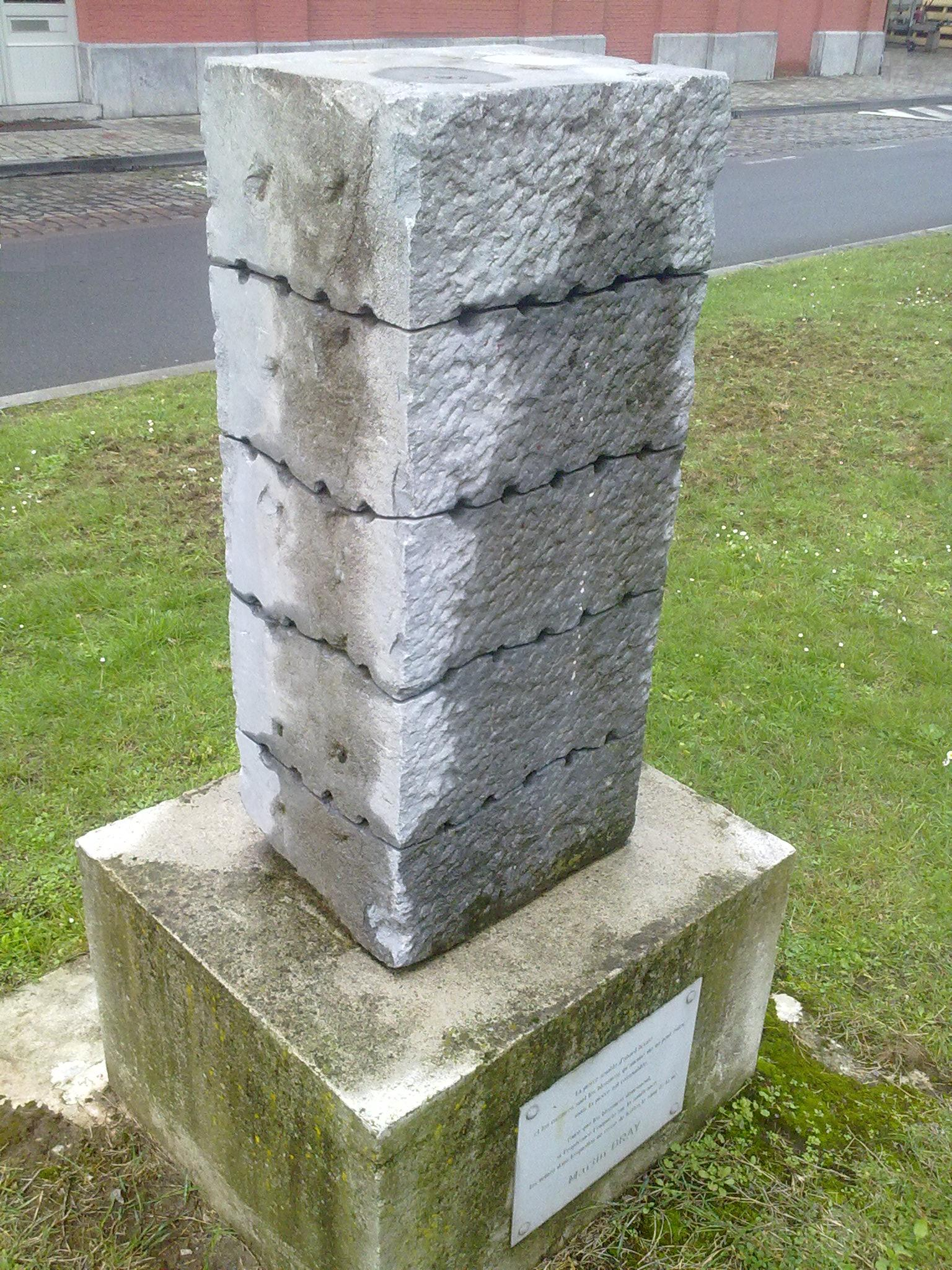
Gray monument erected close to his former Brussels residence in the Uccle district

Martin Gray (born Mieczysław Grajewski; 27 April 1922 – 24 April 2016) was a Holocaust survivor who emigrated to the West, and published books in French about his experiences during World War II, in which his family was killed in German-occupied Poland.

== Life ==
Born in Warsaw, Second Polish Republic, the son of Henry/Henoch and Ida [Feld]; Grajewski (Gray) was 17 years old when Nazi Germany and the Soviet Union invaded Poland; they resided at 23 Mila Street Warsaw. His mother and brothers Isaac and Yacob died in Treblinka extermination camp; his father was killed in the Warsaw Ghetto Uprising of 1943. He wrote later that he escaped from the Treblinka extermination camp during the most deadly phase of the Holocaust. He joined the Red Army during the Soviet counter-offensive and became an officer of the NKVD secret police in August 1944. Grajewski (pseudonym "Zamojski") was tasked with breaking up Polish anti-communist underground in the area of Zambrów. Gray recounted that he slept at the local NKVD headquarters with a pistol in his hand for security.

Grajewski emigrated in 1946 from Europe to the United States, where his grandmother was living. A decade after his arrival Gray had become a tradesman in replicas of antiques according to what he wrote, doing business in the U.S., Canada and Cuba. He moved to the South of France in 1960.

Gray moved to Belgium in 2001. On 24 April 2016, three days before his 94th birthday, he was found dead in his swimming pool at his home in Ciney, Belgium, where he had lived since 2012.

== Writings ==
Gray's first book, For Those I Loved (Au nom de tous les miens), became a bestseller. Another 11 books would follow over the years. All of Gray's books have been written in French. Several of them have been translated into English. Gray's last book Au nom de tous les hommes (2005) has not yet been translated into English.

Two of Gray's books are autobiographies: For Those I Loved covers the era from his birth in 1922 to 1970, when Gray lost his wife and his four children in a forest fire. His second autobiography, La vie renaitra de la nuit, (Life Arises Out of Darkness) covers 1970–77, during which Gray found his second wife, Virginia. In this second autobiography he describes desperately looking for a way to live after the demise of his family in the 1970 fire. In 1979, U.S. photographer David Douglas Duncan produced a book of photographs and text about Gray: The Fragile Miracle of Martin Gray.

== Criticism ==
Holocaust historian Gitta Sereny dismissed Gray's book as a forgery in a 1979 article in New Statesman magazine, writing that "Gray's For Those I Loved was the work of Max Gallo the ghostwriter: "During the research for a Sunday Times inquiry into Gray's work, M. Gallo informed me coolly that he 'needed' a long chapter on Treblinka because the book required something strong for pulling in readers. When I myself told Gray, the 'author', that he had manifestly never been to, nor escaped from Treblinka, he finally asked, despairingly, 'But does it matter? Wasn't the only thing that Treblinka did happen, that it should be written about, and that some Jews should be shown to have been heroic?'" Pierre Vidal-Naquet, a French historian who first followed the idea of Gitta Sereny, has been persuaded by certificates provided by Martin Gray and withdrew his accusations against him. Nevertheless, he continued to blame Max Gallo for taking liberties with the truth.

The Polish daily newspaper Nowiny Rzeszowskie (Rzeszów News) on 2 August 1990 published an interview with World War II Captain Wacław Kopisto, a soldier of the elite Polish Cichociemni unit, who took part in the raid on the Nazi German prison in Pińsk on 18 January 1943. Kopisto was shown the wartime photograph of Martin Gray (a.k.a. Mieczysław Grajewski) and said he had never seen Grajewski/Gray before in his life. Gray described his alleged participation in the same raid in his book For Those I Loved.

Kopisto stated, when asked about any Jew in his unit alluding to Gray, that among the sixteen Polish soldiers in his partisan group there was a Polish Jew from Warsaw by the name of Zygmunt Sulima, his own long-term friend and colleague after the war. No man like the one in the photograph of Gray ever belonged to their unit; Kopisto said: "For the first time in my life I saw Martin Gray in a 1945 photo, which was published in March 1990 in Przekrój magazine [...] There were only sixteen of us participating in the 1943 Pińsk raid, and he was not among us."

In 2010, literary scholar Alexandre Prstojevic mentioned the works of Martin Gray, Jean-François Steiner, and Misha Defonseca as examples of narratives that all share the trait of casting doubt on the identity of their authors and on their actual presence during the events described.

== Selected publications ==
- Au nom de tous les miens, 1971. Available in English as For Those I Loved, ISBN 0316325767
- Les pensees de notre vie., 1976. OCLC 301400453
- J'écris aux hommes de demain, 1984. ISBN 2221012771
- La maison humaine, 1985. ISBN 2221046404
- Le nouveau livre, 1988.
- Martin Gray parle de la vie, 1989.
- Entre la haine et l'amour, 1992. ISBN 2221069692
- Vivre debout : comment faire face dans un monde en crise, 1997. ISBN 2221077237
- La prière de l'enfant, 1998. ISBN 222107968X
- La vie renaîtra de la nuit, 1977. OCLC 4982718 Reissued in 2002.
- Au nom de tous les hommes : Caïn et Abel, 2006.
- Les forces de la vie, 2007.

== In film ==
Gray's life has been put on film: For Those I Loved. The film was broadcast as a mini-series during the 1980s in Europe, starring Michael York and Brigitte Fossey. *A second, shorter film was made by Frits Vrij, who tried to contact Gray for several years. The encounter between Gray and Vrij resulted in a film: Seeking Martin Gray.

== See also ==
- Misha Defonseca
- Herman Rosenblat
- Binjamin Wilkomirski
- Rosemarie Pence
- Enric Marco
- Misery literature
