= Rosemarie Pence =

German-American woman (born 1938)

- Born: c. 1938 (age 87–88)
- Other names: RoseMarie, Hannah Pence
- Occupation: Super 8 Motel desk attendant
- Known for: Claims of being a Holocaust survivor
- Spouse: Wayne Pence
- Children: 1

Rosemarie Pence (formerly Hannah Pence; born c. 1938) is a German-American woman who posed as a child Holocaust survivor from the Dachau Concentration Camp. Pence became the subject of a fake biography titled Hannah: From Dachau to the Olympics and Beyond published in 2005. Her fabrications, which included a fake Jewish background (as Hannah), were discovered in 2009. By 2012 she was wanted in Colorado's Boulder County on an arrest warrant for check fraud and the theft of more than $20,000.

== Claims ==
Pence claimed that as a three-year-old she was taken from her family of German Jews and deported to the Dachau Concentration Camp during World War II. While at the camp, she was the subject of medical experimentation and starvation before being freed by American forces. After liberation, she went to live in a convent with nuns who taught her how to ski. Using those skiing skills, Pence claimed that she competed on Germany's 1956 Olympic ski team in the 1956 Winter Olympics.

Other claims included living in a kibbutz in Israel, her fighter pilot husband being shot down during the Vietnam War, "a scare during the 1972 Olympics, an audience with the Pope, an encounter with Ronald Reagan at the Berlin Wall and an airplane hijacking by a Palestinian terrorist." She also claimed that she was to be awarded an honorary degree by the University of Oklahoma by her "old friend, the Queen of the Netherlands."

Building on her claims, Pence earned speaking fees at schools and other organizations because of her incredible life stories. One such school was the University of Colorado, where Pence led a seminar called "A Horrifying Experience."

It was revealed that her husband Wayne Pence, who had supposedly been shot down during the war, was actually living in another state and had been searching for their son Brian that Pence took from him when Brian was still a toddler. Rosemarie had made an engraved headstone for her husband to corroborate her story, even though the Air Force master sergeant was alive. He stated that Pence has schizophrenia and had been institutionalized in the 1960s. He also stated that Rosemarie was indeed ethnically German, but that she had no Jewish ancestry.

== Messinger's biography of Pence ==
Jean Goodwin Messinger, a local Colorado author, wrote a biography on Pence in 2005. The book was titled Hannah: From Dachau to the Olympics and Beyond. Messinger failed to investigate the claims that Pence made, however, and took Pence's stories at face value. When information came out that Pence had lied and the biography was then fictional, Messinger stated, "I was terribly embarrassed. Not only for me, but for everyone else touched by this."

Messinger continued with "I regarded this woman as a sister for the years I have known her. This revelation is shocking and disappointing to all of us who knew her and loved her, and counted her as a trusted friend."

== Criminal charges ==
A woman in Boulder, Colorado, loaned Pence over $70,000. When confronted about the money, Pence wrote her a $200,000 check to cover the loans, interest and time, but the check bounced as Pence was unable to cover the funds.

Longmont residents David and Deena Kicera let Pence move in with them during 2009 and supported her. David was a police officer and Deena owned a small Christian bookstore. Pence had asked Deena to carry her biography in the store, and the two struck up a friendship and Pence eventually moved into their home. After living with the couple for almost a year, when they questioned Pence about the stories, she fled their home and moved to Butte, Montana, where she began working at a Super 8 Motel. The Boulder County authorities did not seek extradition to Colorado for Pence because of the associated cost, but if she returns to Colorado she will be arrested. She is wanted for felony theft and check fraud.

== See also ==
- Wilkomirski syndrome – Non-Jews presenting as Jewish Holocaust survivors
- Misery literature – Biographical accounts of suffering
- Fake memoir – Type of literary forgery
- Misha Defonseca – Author of a fraudulent Holocaust memoir
- Martin Gray (Holocaust survivor) – Polish writer and Holocaust survivor (1922–2016)
- Herman Rosenblat – Polish-born American author (1929–2015)
- Enric Marco – Spanish impostor (1921–2022)
- Binjamin Wilkomirski – 1995 faux memoir by Binjamin Wilkomirski
