= The Man Who Broke into Auschwitz =

Memoir

- Author: Denis Avey, Rob Broomby
- Publisher: Hodder
- Publication date: 2011

The Man Who Broke Into Auschwitz is the title of a claimed autobiographical, but later classified as semi-autobiographical and semi-fictional book by Denis Avey, who is a recipient of a British Hero of the Holocaust award. The book was written together with Rob Broomby and published by Hodder in 2011. It carries a foreword by Sir Martin Gilbert. The novelist James Long assisted with research and helped to edit and structure the manuscript.

== Book synopsis ==
Denis Avey relates his wartime service and how he came to be held prisoner in E715A, a camp for Allied Prisoners of War adjacent to Auschwitz. He describes how he exchanged uniforms with a Jewish inmate of Auschwitz III in order to enter this camp to discover more about conditions there, with a view to reporting these to the authorities after the war. He also relates how he smuggled cigarettes to another Jewish inmate Ernst Lobethal, having obtained these from Lobethal's sister in Britain. He was convinced that Ernst had died by early 1945, because he could not have survived the death marches when the camp was evacuated. He also said that after the war the authorities were not interested in his story and he kept silence for more than half a century. Eventually he did begin to disclose his story and it came to the attention of the BBC. Rob Broomby was able to trace Lobethal's sister Susanne and her son had a copy of a video recording which her brother had made before his death for the USC Shoah Foundation Institute for Visual History and Education in which he describes how a British POW known as 'Ginger' smuggled the cigarettes to him and how these saved his life by enabling him to exchange them for food and to have new soles put on his boots which enabled him to survive the death march.

== Controversy ==
The World Jewish Congress asked the publisher to have the book verified. Questions have also been raised by British writer, Guy Walters, as to whether Avey actually managed to 'smuggle himself' into Auschwitz. For the paperback edition of Avey's book the publishers issued 'notes on sources' by Broomby and Long, responding to some of the questions raised, available on the publisher's website. However, Avey's application for the "Righteous Among the Nations" award was turned down by Yad Vashem because his story could not be substantiated. Dr. Piotr Setkiewicz, head of research at the Auschwitz-Birkenau Museum told Reuters that he does not think the swap described in the book ever happened. Setkiewicz added that Avey's description of Auschwitz III does not conform to known facts about it, beginning with the "Arbeit Macht Frei" sign upon its entrance, which almost certainly did not exist. He added: "Perhaps 80 or 90% of what Mr. Avey says is true, but the problem is that deniers have this wonderful habit of fixing on every single thing which is obviously not true."

In April 2022, after British-Israeli researcher Alon Shapira raised doubts about the book's veracity, Hodder & Stoughton published a press release defending the book, stating "we have no reason to question the veracity of Denis Avey's book". The following month, The Observer stated it had uncovered evidence that the company planned to add explanatory notes and revisions describing the controversy surrounding The Man Who Broke into Auschwitz to future editions of the book. James Long expressed support for qualifying notes, saying "I would like to provide more of the background information and include some of the questions that have been raised since".

== See also ==
- Wilkomirski syndrome
