= Denis Avey =

British Army soldier during World War II (1919–2015)

- Born: 11 January 1919; Essex, England
- Died: 16 July 2015 (aged 96); Bakewell, Derbyshire, England
- Burial place: St Barnabas' Church, Bradwell, Derbyshire, England
- Military career
- Allegiance: United Kingdom
- Branch: British Army
- Service years: 1939−
- Unit: Rifle Brigade (The Prince Consort's Own)
- Conflicts: Second World War: Western Desert campaign; Prisoner of war at E715
- Awards: British Hero of the Holocaust
- Other work: Engineer author

Denis Avey (11 January 1919 – 16 July 2015) was a British veteran of the Second World War who was held as a prisoner of war at E715, a subcamp of Auschwitz concentration camp. While there he saved the life of a Jewish prisoner, Ernst Lobethal, by smuggling cigarettes to him. For that he was made a British Hero of the Holocaust in 2010.

Avey claimed that he exchanged uniforms with a Jewish prisoner and smuggled himself into Auschwitz to witness the treatment of Jewish inmates, whose camp was separate from but adjoined that of British POWs. His claim has been challenged. His memoir The Man who Broke into Auschwitz, written with Rob Broomby, was published in 2011.

== Life (until retirement) ==
Avey was born in Essex, England, in 1919. As a boy he learned boxing, was head boy at school and studied at Leyton technical college. He joined the army in 1939 at the age of 20, and fought in the Western Desert campaign of North Africa in the 7th Armoured Division, (the "Desert Rats"). He was captured by the Germans while attacking Erwin Rommel's forces near Tobruk, Libya, and saw his best friend killed next to him. After his prisoner transport ship was torpedoed he claimed to have escaped to Greece by floating ashore on top of a packing crate, but was recaptured after landing.

After being retaken prisoner, Avey was placed in the E715 prison camp for British prisoners of war (POWs), next to the Auschwitz concentration camp where Jews were imprisoned. He was there from 1943 until January 1945. While there he befriended a Jewish inmate of Auschwitz, Ernst Lobethal, from the adjoining Jewish section. He obtained cigarettes from Ernst's sister, who had escaped from Germany to Britain on a Kindertransport before the war. He secretly passed the cigarettes to Ernst who used them as currency to help him survive.

With that simple exchange between the two of us I had given away the protection of the Geneva Convention: I'd given my uniform, my lifeline, my best chance of surviving that dreadful place, to another man ... If I was caught, the guards would have shot me out of hand as an imposter. No question at all.

— Denis Avey

Avey said that he twice exchanged uniforms with a Jewish inmate to smuggle himself into the inmate's camp in order to witness for himself the treatment of Jews, which he could see was completely different from the treatment of British POWs. While British POWs were forced to work six days a week, they could use their free time to play football and basketball. While their conditions were dreadful, according to one British inmate, "they were as nothing compared to what the Jews next door went through". Avey agreed, and describes the plight of the Jews:

I am telling you I know without exaggeration, nearly 200,000 prisoners in Auschwitz were worked to death. Not killed. Were worked to death and they claimed total innocence. They lived for no more than 4 months. They were clubbed and beaten every day without any justification whatsoever.

Avey explained to The Daily Telegraph that he was the type that needed to see things for himself:

My mates didn't want me to do it but they agreed because they realised I was going to do it, and that was that. I had watched people being murdered literally every day and I knew someone would have to answer for it. I wanted to get in and identify the people responsible.

He was aware that he was taking "a hell of a chance", and states: "When you think about it in today's environment it is ludicrous, absolutely ludicrous. You wouldn't think anyone would think or do that, but that is how I was. I had red hair and a temperament to match. Nothing would stop me."

Avey escaped during the "death marches" in April 1945 which followed the Nazis' evacuation of Auschwitz. Although suffering from tuberculosis he caught in the camp, he broke away undetected, then made his way through Silesia, Czechoslovakia and Germany. During the march Avey saw an estimated 15,000 dead prisoners, recalling that "the road was littered with corpses". He eventually ran into Americans who helped get him back to England, and to his family who assumed he had died.

After he returned to England, Avey spent the next year and a half hospitalised with tuberculosis. Afterwards, when he tried to report what he saw in Auschwitz, he encountered resistance and indifference. From then on, he chose not to speak of it again to anyone:

In 1947, I went to the military authorities to submit my information about Auschwitz. Their eyes glazed over. I wasn't taken seriously. I was shocked, especially after the risks I'd taken. I felt completely disillusioned, and traumatised as well. So from then on I bottled it up, and tried to piece my life back together.

The author Sir Martin Gilbert explains that by 1947, after the Nuremberg Trials were finished, "people just wanted to get on with their lives". Average citizens were not interested in discussing the war anymore, nor were they interested in hearing war stories from veterans or former POWs like Avey. "It must have been very painful", says Gilbert.

Despite the danger, I knew I had to bear witness. As Albert Einstein said: the world can be an evil place, not because of those who do evil, but because of those who look on and do nothing. I've never been one to do nothing.

— Denis Avey

Besides tuberculosis, Avey suffered from posttraumatic stress disorder (PTSD) before it was recognised as a medical illness, a condition few people were aware of. For the following years he battled with nightmares, jumpiness, and an inability to speak about his POW experiences. He suffered from a violent temper, stomach pains and loss of memory. From a beating during his incarceration, he also lost vision in one eye which became cancerous and required being replaced with a glass eye. The cause of the beating, Avey said, came when he cursed an SS officer who was beating a Jew in the camp. The officer took his pistol butt and gave Avey a blow directly on his eye.

When war crime prosecutors later sought Avey's testimony for the Nuremberg Trials, they were unable to locate him. He kept the traumatic events about his wartime past a complete secret from everyone, including his first and second wives, along with his daughter. "I knew there was something," said his wife, Audrey. "Naturally, you ask questions. But I never got an answer." Avey explains "The sad irony was that I went in there to find out the truth, so I could tell everybody about the horrors of the Nazi regime. But I was so traumatised at my whole experience of the Auschwitz camps it took me 60 years to be able to recount the horrors I saw."

He first began disclosing these events when invited to appear on the BBC to talk about war pensions. His memories began tumbling out, shocking the television hosts who were unable to believe what they were hearing. As a result, the BBC began production of a documentary, discovering the name of the young Jewish prisoner Avey had befriended in Auschwitz, Ernst Lobethal. When asked why he risked his life to infiltrate the Jewish sections of the concentration camp, he states that he needed to see for himself "the unspeakable things being done to the Jews at Auschwitz". At the age of 91, he reflected back on this episode:

You know the word "conjecture"? It's never been in my vocabulary. I wanted to know exactly what was happening inside there. ... I knew there had to be eventually a reckoning to all this. ... I don't feel like a hero. I'm embarrassed, ... I had certain ideals that I grew up with.

He had assumed that Ernst had died during the death march, but tracked down and met Ernst's sister, Susanne, who also thought he died. She had escaped to England before war broke out in 1939.

Years later, Susanne learned that her brother had survived, in part thanks to Avey, and had lived in America with his new family until his death. While he never got to meet Ernst, he said that his surviving was "bloody marvellous". Ernst, like Avey, refused to burden anyone with his own suffering and never talked about Auschwitz until very late in life. But, says Avey, "I, too, have left it late. I will always regret not tracking Ernst down while he was alive. If I'd known he was living in America, I would have gone and found him, without doubt. But I am proud to have played a small part in helping one man through the obscenity of Auschwitz."

Avey married twice and pursued a career in engineering, which culminated in him building a factory near Newcastle. He retired to Bradwell, Derbyshire.

== Recognition ==
After retirement he became active amongst ex-POWs seeking compensation for wartime imprisonment and began to talk about these experiences. In 2001 he described these in an interview with the Imperial War Museum, London, where he stated that he had obtained cigarettes for Ernst and also gave the name of Ernst's sister Susanne. He also stated that he had exchanged uniforms with a bunkmate of Ernst and entered Birkenau in the company of Ernst.

Avey got details about events inside Birkenau which he sent home to his mother and sister in code. His mother sent two letters regarding this to the War Office but never received a reply. He was interviewed on BBC Radio Derby in 2003. In 2005 the Daily Mirror reported that Avey claimed to have swapped uniforms with Ernst and entered Birkenau where he witnessed prisoners being sent to the gas chambers.

I knew in my gut that these swine would eventually be held to account. Evidence would be vital. Of course, sneaking into the Jewish camp was a ludicrous idea. It was like breaking into Hell. But that's the sort of chap I was. Reckless.

— Denis Avey

In May 2009 the British Government announced the establishment of the British Hero of the Holocaust award. That autumn Rob Broomby, a reporter from the BBC, who had known of Avey's story for some years, was able to trace Ernst's sister in Birmingham. He learned that Ernst had survived the death march and emigrated to the United States where he lived to the age of 77. Broomby also discovered that before his death, Ernst had recorded a video testimony of his experiences in Auschwitz, in which he mentions the British soldier whom he knew as "Ginger" who obtained cigarettes. This "Ginger" was Avey. BBC Television subsequently broadcast a documentary which included an emotional reunion between Avey and Susanne, where Avey sees Ernst's video testimony for the first time and realises that his cigarettes saved his life.

Although Lobethal – now Lobet – made no mention on the video of having swapped uniforms with Avey, the documentary did include Avey's account of an exchange with an unnamed prisoner. An article by Broomby published at the time of the first broadcast suggested that he and the BBC had accepted the "break-in" story as also confirmed. Denis Avey was then received by British Prime Minister Gordon Brown to mark International Holocaust Remembrance Day, and in 2010 he was named a British Hero of the Holocaust by the British Government for having saved Ernst's life.

The following week Avey signed a book contract with Hodder and Stoughton to write his story. The book appeared in April 2011 with a foreword by Sir Martin Gilbert. The book, The Man who Broke into Auschwitz, went on to be a best-seller and has been translated into a number of languages.

== Reactions by others ==
Brian Bishop, a British POW interviewed by Walters, while he did not claim to know Avey, stated "I can't understand how he did it. To do something like that you need to have several people helping on both sides — our side and the Jewish side." Similar doubt about the feat was expressed by Ron Jones, another British POW, who also found it hard to believe that Avey, a tall, fit, strong Englishman, could have passed himself off alongside "starving six-stone Jews".

Nevertheless, British historian Lyn Smith, who interviewed Avey for the Imperial War Museum in 2001, insisted that he was an "utterly reliable witness", and defended Avey in the face of these doubts, saying "It's pitiful what happened to him." She included Avey in her book Heroes of the Holocaust. Avey's publisher accepted that in his interview with Smith, Avey's recollections could be confused, but this was understandable given the stress suffered and that he was only then beginning to unburden himself after so many decades of silence.

Yad Vashem considered Avey for the honour Righteous among the Nations, but said it was unable to grant the award because it was unable to substantiate his account of the prisoner swap. In November 2014 Avey was reported as too ill to respond to further enquiries. He died on 16 July 2015 at Newholme Hospital in Bakewell, Derbyshire.

== See also ==
- Stalag VIII-B
- Charles Coward and Arthur Dodd: Inmates of E715A
- Leon Greenman: British inmate of Monowitz
- Irma Grese: Nazi Guard "The Hyena of Auschwitz"
- Witold Pilecki: Polish resistance fighter who voluntarily entered Auschwitz, and Witold's Report
- Victor Perez: Boxer and inmate of Monowitz

== Access to sources ==
Avey's 2001 interview with Lyn Smith is available online and may also be heard in the "Explore History" section of the Imperial War Museum during museum opening hours, without pre-booking. His account of entering Auschwitz is on reels 7 and 8, but is not mentioned in the index. The full text of Nicholas Hellen's article may be read through NewsBank.
