= Gisella Perl =

Gynecologist and author

- Gisella Perl on the cover of her Auschwitz memoir first published in 1948
- Born: 10 December 1907; Máramarossziget, Austria-Hungary (modern day Sighetu Marmației, Romania)
- Died: 16 December 1988 (aged 81); Herzliya, Israel
- Occupation: Doctor
- Known for: Holocaust memoir I was a doctor in Auschwitz; OCLC 2355040
- Spouse: Ephraim Krauss (murdered in the Holocaust)
- Children: 2

Gisella Perl (10 December 1907 – 16 December 1988) was a Hungarian Jewish gynecologist deported to Auschwitz concentration camp in 1944, where she helped hundreds of women, serving as an inmate gynecologist. She worked without the bare necessities required to practice medicine. Perl survived the Holocaust, immigrated to New York, and became one of the first women to publicize the Holocaust experience in English through her 1948 memoir, I Was a Doctor in Auschwitz. She later specialized in infertility treatment at Mount Sinai Hospital, New York and eventually moved with her daughter to live in Herzliya, Israel, until her death.

== Early life and education ==
Gisella Perl was born and grew up in Máramarossziget (now Sighetu Marmaţiei), then part of Hungary. Following the Trianon peace treaty of 1920, the area became part of Romania and from 1940–1944, it was again under Hungarian control. In 1923, at age 16, she graduated first in her secondary school class—the only woman and the only Jew. Her father, Maurice Perl, initially forbade her from studying medicine, fearing she would “lose her faith and break away from Judaism". He relented a few months later.

== Auschwitz ==
Perl became a successful gynecologist in Sighetu Marmaţiei. She married internist Dr. Ephraim Krauss, and practiced until 1944, when Nazi Germany occupied her hometown during its invasion of Hungary and deported her and her family to Auschwitz concentration camp. At Auschwitz, Dr. Josef Mengele assigned her to work as a gynecologist in the women’s camp, where she treated inmates without access to basic medical supplies such as antiseptics, clean wipes, or running water.

She is best known for temporarily saving the lives of hundreds of women by performing secret abortions—pregnant women were often executed or used in Mengele’s medical experiments.

She was later transferred to Bergen-Belsen, where she was ultimately liberated. After the war, Perl discovered that her husband, only son, parents, and extended family had all perished in the Holocaust. In despair, she attempted suicide by poisoning herself and was sent to a convent in France to recover until 1947.

In March 1947, she arrived in New York City on a temporary visa to lecture, sponsored by the Hungarian-Jewish Appeal and the United Jewish Appeal. She lived in an affluent neighborhood in New York. U.S. Representative Sol Bloom petitioned the Justice Department to grant her permanent residency, but the request was initially denied.

On March 12, 1948, President Harry Truman signed a bill sponsored by Bloom, allowing her to remain in the U.S. as a permanent resident. Perl was questioned by the INS under suspicion of collaborating with Nazi doctors at Auschwitz, but she was cleared. Later that year, Eleanor Roosevelt encouraged her to resume practicing medicine. Perl began working as a gynecologist at Mount Sinai Hospital, New York, initially as the only female physician in the labor and delivery department. She eventually became a specialist in infertility treatment. She became a U.S. citizen in 1951 at age 44.

Perl authored or co-authored nine academic papers on vaginal infections, published between 1955 and 1972.

== I Was a Doctor in Auschwitz ==
In June 1948, Perl published her memoir I Was a Doctor in Auschwitz, recounting her experiences as a physician in the camp. She described harrowing procedures, including breast surgeries on young women without anesthetics, often using only a knife. One chapter recounts Irma Grese—a 19-year-old Aufseherin or warden —observing these operations with evident pleasure. Perl wrote that Grese’s “face [was] clear and angelic and her blue eyes the gayest, the most innocent eyes one can imagine.” These depictions contributed to the portrayal of Grese during her post-war trial, which resulted in her execution.

Perl’s memoir was one of at least eight Holocaust accounts by female survivors, corroborated by other testimonies. Olga Lengyel, another Hungarian Jewish inmate and surgical assistant, described similar experiences with Grese in her 1947 book, Five Chimneys, the first Holocaust memoir by a woman to be published in English. Historian Andrea Rudorff has disputed some of Perl's testimony, arguing that Perl did not work in Mengele's lab.

== Personal life and death ==
Perl was reunited with her daughter in 1979, Gabriella Krauss Blattman, who had managed to hide with a non-Jewish family during the war, as the two relocated to Herzliya, Israel. Perl died there on December 16, 1988, at the age of 81.

== Publications ==
In 2003, a film entitled Out of the Ashes was released. It was based upon the story of Dr. Perl's life, and starred Christine Lahti as Dr. Perl.
