= Duberstein =

Duberstein is a surname. Notable people with the surname include:

- Conrad B. Duberstein (c. 1915–2005), American judge
- Kenneth Duberstein (1944–2022), American businessman and government official
- Larry Duberstein (born 1944), American author
