= Beth Tikvah =

Beth Tikvah or Beit Tikvah (Hebrew: בֵּית תִקְוָה "House of Hope") may refer to the following synagogues:

- Congregation Beth Tikvah, Dollard-des-Ormeaux, Quebec
- Beth Tikvah Synagogue (Toronto), Ontario
- Beit Tikvah of Ottawa, Ontario
