= Doron Rabinovici =

Israeli-Austrian writer, historian and essayist

Doron Rabinovici in 2026

Doron Rabinovici (Hebrew: 'דורון רבינוביץ) is an Israeli-Austrian writer, historian and essayist. He was born in Tel Aviv in 1961 and moved to Vienna in 1964. His literary work includes short stories, novels and essays, but also drama.

== Life ==
Doron Rabinovici was born in Israel on December 2, 1961, but the family moved to Vienna in 1964. Rabinovici studied at the University of Vienna and received his doctorate in 2000 with the historical work Instanzen der Ohnmacht. The Viennese Jewish community leadership from 1938 to 1945 and their reaction to National Socialist persecution and extermination. Rabinovici's doctoral thesis concerns the reaction of the Viennese Jewish community's administration to the persecution by the National Socialists and the community's consequent extermination. Published in 2000 as Instanzen der Ohnmacht (Authorities of Powerlessness) by Jüdischer Verlag (a branch of Suhrkamp), it raises the painful questions of resistance and collusion that have come to dominate recent debates on the Holocaust. The study was published in English by Polity Books in 2011 under the title Eichmann's Jews.

Doron Rabinovici not only writes literary texts such as the short story collection Papirnik (1994) or the novels Suche nach M. (1999), Ohnehin (2004), Andernorts (2010), Die Außerirdischen (2017) and Die Einstellung (2022), but also numerous non-fictional texts in which he comments on developments in Austria and politics. He also provides information on Jewish identity, but also on poetological considerations, such as his writing intentions or the role of literature.

Rabinovici's first novel, Suche nach M (1997), deals with the aftermath of extermination. His other novels also repeatedly deal with dealing with memory, the Nazi past, foreignness, migration, right-wing extremism in Austria and Jewish life in Vienna.

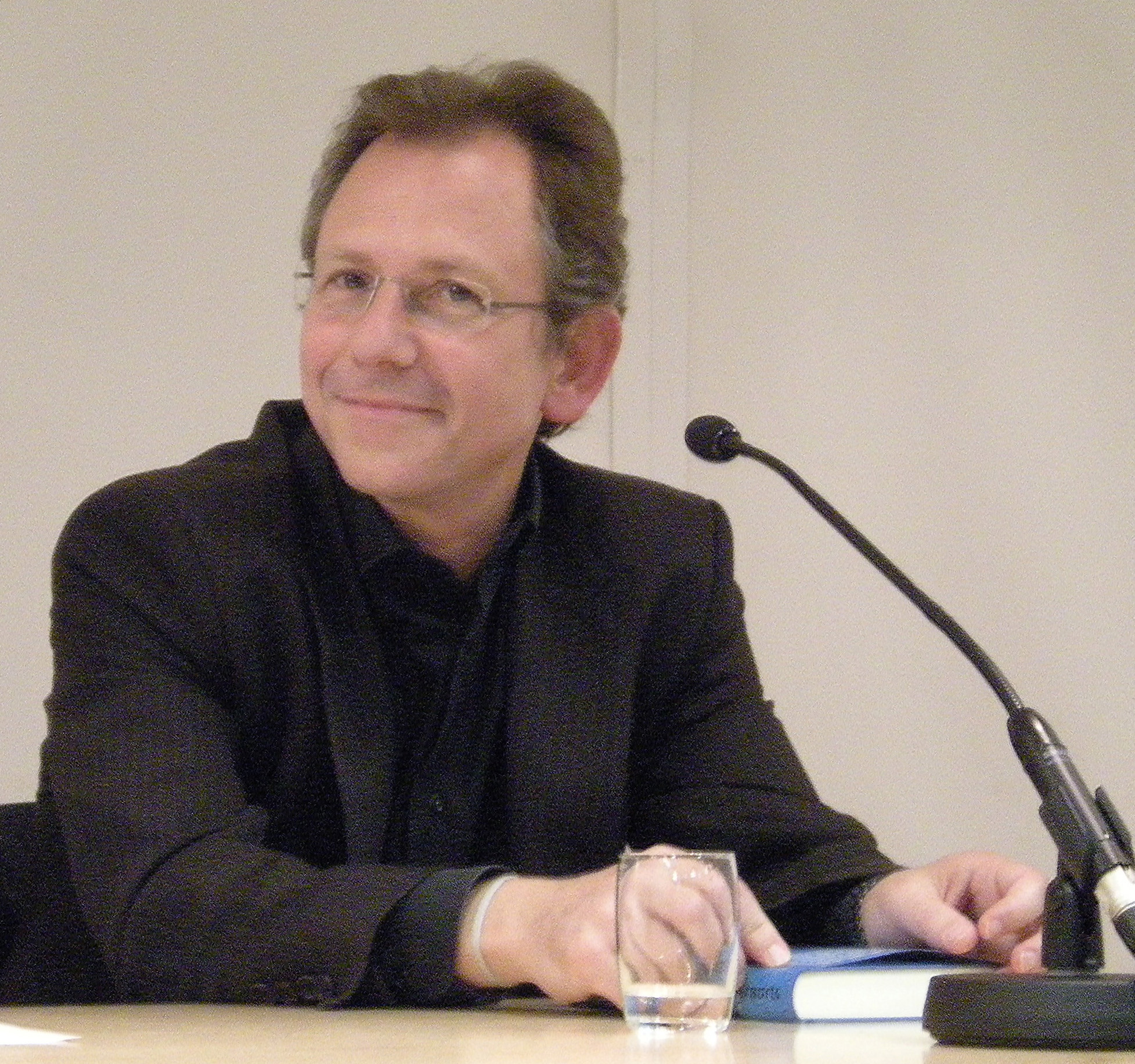
Doron Rabinovici presenting his novel "Andernorts" in Vienna, on 16 September 2010.

In 2013 and 2014, he initiated and conceived the production "Die letzten Zeugen" at the Burgtheater together with Matthias Hartmann. The production staged the memory of seven survivors. The performance was set on the main stage of the Burgtheater. The testimonies of the seven survivors were based on their books or on interviews with them. The texts are recited by four actors. Rabinovici compiled the text book for the performance; the production referred to the November pogroms of 1938, the 75th anniversary of which was celebrated in 2013.

In 2018, based on an idea by Florian Klenk, Doron Rabinovici put together the drama collage "Anything can happen!" A political theater, a mosaic of speeches and statements by Europe's racist populist government politicians that reveals the nature and intentions of these policies. The reading is merely commented on by individual quotations from Hannah Arendt, Viktor Klemperer and Erich Kästner and is framed by a few sentences written by Rabinovici. "Anything can happen!"(Original title: Alles kann passieren!) has been performed several times at the Burgtheater and other German-speaking stages.

Doron Rabinovici is a member of the board of the Grazer Autorinnen Autorenversammlung. He has been an associate member of the Mainz Academy of Sciences and Literature since 2018.

Doron Rabinovici's mother, Shoshana Rabinovici, comes from Vilnius, the capital of Lithuania, then still Poland, survived the ghetto, concentration camps and the death march and came to Israel in the 1950s. Schoschana Rabinovici described the story of her survival in her book Thanks to My Mother. His father, David Rabinovici, fled from Romania to Palestine in 1944.

== Works ==
=== Books ===
- Papirnik: Stories. Frankfurt/M.: edition suhrkamp, 1994 (ISBN 3-518-11889-7)
- The Search for M, Novel in twelve episodes. Ariadne Pr, (ISBN 978-1572410886)
- Eichman's Jews, The Jewish Administration of Holocaust Vienna, 1938–1945, Polity Press, 2011 (ISBN 978-0745646824). Reviewed by Christopher Browning in New York Review of Books, August 16, 2012, pages 70–75.
- Elsewhere. Haus Publishing, 2014 (ISBN 9781908323491)
- Ohnehin. Roman. Frankfurt/M.: Suhrkamp, 2005 (ISBN 3-518-45736-5)
- Credo und Credit: Einmischungen. Frankfurt/M.: edition suhrkamp, 2001 (ISBN 3-518-12216-9)
- Der ewige Widerstand. Über einen strittigen Begriff. Styria-Verlag, 2008 (ISBN 978-3-222-13239-1)
- Das Jooloomooloo. Doron Rabinovici (Text), Christina Gschwantner (Illustration), jooloomooloo, Wien, 2008 (ISBN 978-3-200-01231-8)

=== Theater ===
- 2013 - 2015: Die letzten Zeugen. A project of the Vienna Burgtheater staged by Matthias Hartmann. Text collage compiled by Doron Rabinovici
- 2018 - 2019: Alles kann passieren! Ein Polittheater; a project at the Vienna Burgtheater based on an idea by Florian Klenk, text collage compiled by Doron Rabinovici

=== Radio play ===
2014: Abrahams Stunde; Production Hessischer Rundfunk with Österreichischer Rundfunk; Director: Götz Fritsch, Dramaturgy: Ursula Ruppel

== Politics ==
Since 1986, Rabinovici has been speaker of the Republican Club New Austria, an intellectual group that was formed against the background of the anti-Semitic presidential campaign of Kurt Waldheim. In 1999, Rabinovici became the speaker of Demokratische Offensive (Democratic Offensive), a movement geared to mobilize the Austrian civil society against the threat of a center-right coalition with Haider's extreme right-wing party. The Demokratische Offensive called for mass demonstrations against racism. The response was overwhelming – in February 2000, 300,000 people assembled on Vienna's historic Heldenplatz to stage the largest demonstration in Austria's post-war history.

== Awards ==
- 1994 3-Sat-scholarship at the Ingeborg Bachmann competition
- 1997 Ernst-Robert-Curtius-Förderpreis für Essayistik (award for essays)
- 1998 Hermann-Lenz-scholarship
- 1999 Bruno-Kreisky-Anerkennungspreis
- 2000
  - Mörike-Förderpreis of the city of Fellbach (literary award)
  - Heimito-von-Doderer-Förderpreis of the city of Cologne (literary award)
  - cultural award of the city of Vienna
- 2002
  - Clemens-Brentano-award of the city of Heidelberg
  - Jean Améry-award
- 2004 Author of the year of the literary journal Buchkultur
- 2022: Austrian Decoration for Science and Art

== See also ==
- List of Austrian writers
- Schoschana Rabinovici
