= Celeste Raspanti =

American playwright (1928–2026)

- Born: Celeste Rita Raspanti; September 10, 1928; Chicago, Illinois, U.S.
- Died: March 3, 2026 (aged 97); Saint Paul, Minnesota, U.S.
- Education: Alverno College (BA); Marquette University (MA); University of Minnesota (PhD)
- Occupation: Playwright

Celeste Rita Raspanti (September 10, 1928 – March 3, 2026) was an American playwright who published and produced several full-length and one-act plays. She is known for her plays depicting life in a Czechoslovak concentration camp during World War II. The focus of these three plays was on the experiences of the imprisoned Jewish children.

== Early experiences and education ==
Raspanti was born in Chicago on September 10, 1928, to an Italian immigrant father and Italian-American mother. She was educated in Catholic schools and says that she first became interested in writing when she won a high school essay contest in 1943. She attended Alverno College in Milwaukee, Wisconsin, graduating in 1950. She earned a Masters degree in English from Marquette University in 1957. Her teaching career began while she was in a convent. Raspanti became a nun and was known for a time as Sister M. Poverello (OSF). Later she returned to using the name Celeste Raspanti and is now referred to as a former nun. She received her PhD at the University of Minnesota in 1977.

== Career in education and drama ==
Raspanti became a professor of English at Alverno College and worked closely with Robert G. Pitman, director of the Alverno Masquers dramatic group and later Academic Dean of the college. For a time in the 1970s, she was Associate Director Theater Drama, Advisory Service Continuing Education in the Arts at the University of Minnesota. She also was a professor at St. Thomas University in St. Paul, Minnesota.

She developed a special interest in the Holocaust, which she first brought to the stage with I Never Saw Another Butterfly. This play is based on the real-life story of Holocaust survivor Raja Englanderova (married name Raja Lodinova) and stories from the Theresienstadt concentration camp in the fortress town of Terezín, Czechoslovakia (now Czech Republic). The play takes its name from a poem by Pavel Friedmann, who was imprisoned at Theresienstadt, then killed at Auschwitz concentration camp in 1944 at 23 years old. Friedmann's poem, "The Butterfly," was found at the end of the war and published posthumously. Raspanti recollected that her deep interest in the Holocaust began when she happened to find a book of drawings and poems by Jewish children at Terezín. Friedmann's poem gave the book its title: I Never Saw Another Butterfly: Children's Drawings and Poems from Terezin Concentration Camp, 1942-1944 (originally published in 1959 in Czech; published in English in 1964).

Raspanti wrote the play 21 years after the end of the war, when most Americans were aware of concentration camps and the horrors of World War II. More than 60 years later, there has been renewed interest in staging I Never Saw Another Butterfly, in part because it offers an opportunity for younger generations to explore the Nazi genocide and responses to it.

Another important feature of the artistic work of the children of Terezín is the history of the drawings and poems themselves. First nurtured by the Jewish women who set up arts programs for their children, then surreptitiously saved by those women, then recorded in a book, then made into a play, the children's art lives on as monuments to the importance of the arts, of creativity. In a world dominated by fear and impermanence, the children of Terezín were given moments of respite, of creativity and of hope. Children were encouraged to imagine beauty, with flowers and butterflies, although there were none in the prison of Terezín. Butterflies became a symbol of defiance in that world.

Raspanti's play was first titled A Place of Springs. It premiered under that name at Alverno College in 1967. The play continues to be performed nationally by student and adult theater groups and is often paired with other educational materials about the Holocaust.

Her subsequent plays on this topic include No Fading Star (1979) and The Terezin Promise (2004). Raspanti has been acclaimed for enriching her stories with firsthand information of the camps from visits, oral histories, and her friendship with survivors – most notably, with Raja Englanderova, the protagonist of I Never Saw Another Butterfly.

Known primarily for her Holocaust-related plays, Raspanti has written a number of other plays, including several for children. Mr. Noah interprets the biblical story of Noah's Ark, and Where the Lilies Bloom adapts the book by Vera and Bill Cleaver into a full length play. Raspanti also publishes in academic and professional journals.

== Personal life and death ==
Raspanti resided in St. Paul, Minnesota, where she was the Archivist of the Cathedral of Saint Paul at the National Shrine of the Apostle Paul.

Raspanti died on March 3, 2026, at the age of 97.

== Recognition and awards ==
- Myrtle Leaf Award for contribution to the arts – Milwaukee Hadassah (November 1967)
- Special commendation – Wisconsin Council of Writers
