= Michel Kichka =

Israeli cartoonist and illustrator of Belgian origin

Michel Kichka מישל קישקה
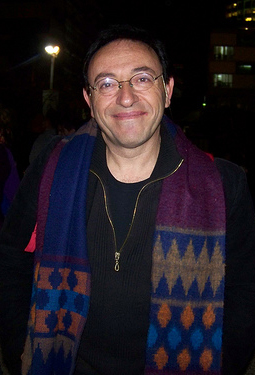
- Michel Kichka, 2008
- Born: 1954 (age 71–72) Liège, Belgium
- Area: Artist
- Awards: Chevalier Des Arts Et Des Lettres (2011), Dosh Award (2008)

Michel Kichka (Hebrew: מישל קישקה; born 1954) is an Israeli cartoonist and illustrator of Belgian origin. His father was Holocaust survivor Henri Kichka.

== Biography ==
Michel Kichka was born in Belgium to Henri Kichka, a Holocaust survivor, and his wife, Lucia (née Świerczyński). He immigrated to Israel in 1974 and studied art at the Bezalel Academy, where he became an instructor and one of Israel's leading comic book artists and political cartoonists. Students he trained in the field include Rutu Modan and Uri Fink. Kichka produces comics in French and Hebrew for various media outlets including Le Monde and TV5. He is married to Olivia and they have three sons.

== Awards and recognition ==
Kichka won the Israeli Dosh Cartoonist Award in 2008. In 2006 he joined the UNRIC movement Cartooning for Peace. In 2011 he was granted the prestigious Chevalier Des Arts Et Des Lettres honor by the French Culture Ministry. Kichka serves as head of the Israel Cartoonists Guild.

== See also ==
- Israeli art
