= Beth Tikvah Synagogue (Toronto) =

Synagogue in Toronto, Ontario

- Hebrew: בית תקוה
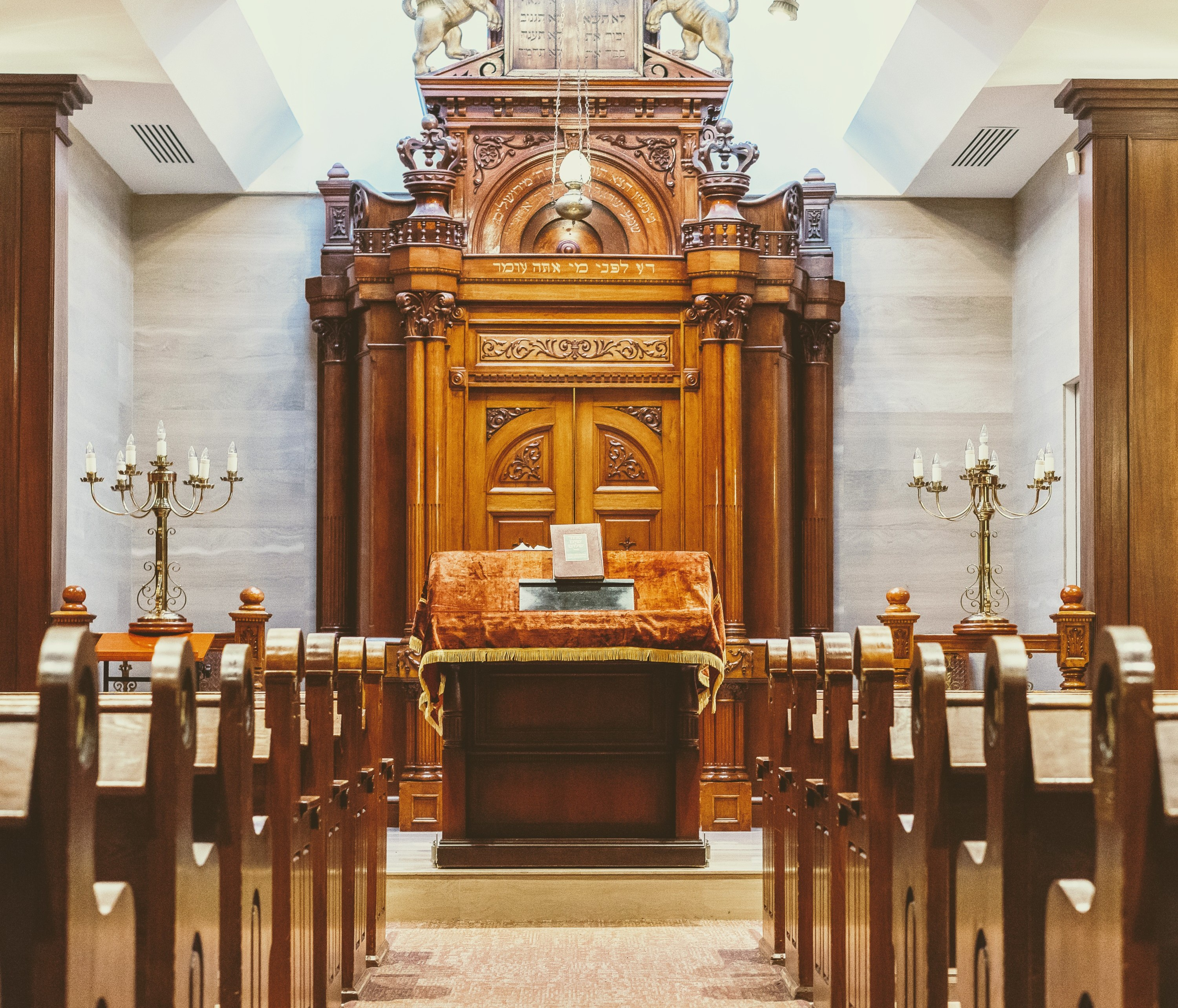
- The Torah ark in the Feder Chapel of Beth Tikvah Synagogue

- Location in Toronto

Religion
- Affiliation: Judaism
- Rite: Conservative
- Ecclesiastical or organizational status: Synagogue
- Leadership: Rabbi Jarrod R. Grover; Hazzan Tibor Kovari
- Status: Active

Location
- Location: 3080 Bayview Avenue; Toronto, Ontario; M2N 5L3
- Interactive map of Beth Tikvah Synagogue
- Coordinates: 43.7788096°N 79.3941443°W

Architecture
- Established: April 14, 1964

Website
- bethtikvahtoronto.org

Beth Tikvah Synagogue (Hebrew: בית תקוה) is an egalitarian Conservative synagogue in the Willowdale neighbourhood in the former city of North York in Toronto, Ontario, Canada, with a membership of approximately 1100 families. The synagogue formally disaffiliated with the United Synagogue of Conservative Judaism in 2013 in order to affiliate with the Canadian Council of Conservative Synagogues.

The synagogue was founded on April 14, 1964, as Shaarei Tikvah, after a synagogue in Amsterdam that had been razed by the Nazis. It became Beth Tikvah after a merger in 1966 with the Bayview Synagogue Association. Rabbi Avraham Feder served as the first rabbi of the synagogue from 1967 until 1981 when he moved to Israel and continued to serve as Rabbi Emeritus. Rabbi Feder died on February 8, 2018.

Srul Irving Glick, the famed composer and conductor, served as Beth Tikvah's composer-in-residence from 1969 to 2002.
