= Out of the Ashes (2003 film) =

2003 American television film

- Genre: Drama
- Based on: I Was a Doctor in Auschwitz by Gisella Perl
- Screenplay by: Anne Meredith
- Directed by: Joseph Sargent
- Starring: Christine Lahti; Beau Bridges; Richard Crenna; Bruce Davison; Jonathan Cake; Jolyon Baker
- Music by: Charles Bernstein
- Country of origin: United States
- Original language: English

Production
- Executive producers: Gerald W. Abrams; Thomas Michael Donnelly; Robert Halmi Jr. Marianne Moloney; Prince Edward, Duke of Edinburgh
- Producers: Lee Levinson; Robertas Urbonas
- Cinematography: Donald M. Morgan
- Editor: Michael Brown
- Running time: 113 minutes
- Production companies: Ardent Productions; Contenders Only; Cypress Point Productions; Lietuvos Kinostudija

Original release
- Network: Showtime
- Release: April 13, 2003

Out of the Ashes is a 2003 American made-for-television biographical drama film that was released by Showtime. It is a dramatization of the life of Holocaust concentration camp survivor Gisella Perl and is based on her book I Was a Doctor in Auschwitz. The film is dedicated to the memory of Richard Crenna, who died three months before it was released.

== Plot ==
Gisella Perl, a Jewish-Hungarian gynecologist from Sighetul Marmatiei, Romania, testifies before an Immigration & Naturalization Service (INS) review board consisting of three men. Perl is seeking to be granted citizenship after passing the New York State Medical Licensing Board examinations, wishing to begin practicing in New York. She recounts her early life when she aspired to be a doctor despite the admonishments of her father, her time practicing as a gynecologist before the German invasion, and her experiences as prisoner #25404, where she provided what medical care she could to fellow prisoners. Her most controversial actions included providing late-term abortions to pregnant women to save their lives. These pregnant women would otherwise have been killed immediately or subjected to the torture of horrific "medical" experiments.

Perl is accused of "colluding" with the Nazi doctor Josef Mengele, who directed experiments on pregnant female inmates at the Auschwitz concentration camp. As the review board questions her over several days, she becomes increasingly emotional and questions her own determination to survive, as well as her guilt at having lived while so many others did not. She testifies that despite her intention to keep herself and others alive, she unknowingly became part of the Nazi efforts to kill, but she held on to the hope that the lives of the women she saved would undermine the efforts of the Nazis to exterminate the Jewish people. After she is granted citizenship and begins to practice in New York, she gets a call to attend to one of the women whose first baby she had aborted in the camp. She delivers the baby and sees her wish, that some Jews will survive the Holocaust, fulfilled.

== Cast ==
- Christine Lahti as Gisella Perl
- Beau Bridges as Herman Prentiss
- Richard Crenna as Jake Smith
- Bruce Davison as Peter Schuman
- Jonathan Cake as Dr. Mengele
- Zoie Palmer as Didi Goldstein
- Jolyon Baker as Frederick Krauss
- Jessica Beitchman as Marta Weiss
- Oliver Cotton as Moshe Perl
- Michelle Fine as Fanny Perl
- Maria Ricossa as Esther Jacob
- Ingrid Veninger as Zozia
- Emma Wellbelove as Young Gisella
- Nina Young as Irma Grese
- Vytautas Rumšas as David Perl
- Inga Tuminienė as Cilla Perl
- Adrija Čepaitė-Palšauskienė as Rose Perl
- Inga Maskarina as Helen Perl
- Nola Augustson as Sarah Goldstein
- Alan Jordan as Isaac Goldstein
- Judah Katz as Dr. Jonas Ruben
- Monika Bičiūnaitė as Dr. Ruth Stern
- Viola Klimčiauskaitė as Katya Weiss
- Kristina Mauruševičiūtė as Leitu
- Getter Kosolov as Young Cilla Perl
- Aurelija Prašmuntaitė as Young Rose Perl
- Joonas Suokko as Young David Perl
- Elena Stončiūtė as Young Helen Perl
- Sara Jessica Karimjee as Hannah Mary Lal
