= Paul Sobol =

Belgian Holocaust survivor (1926–2020)

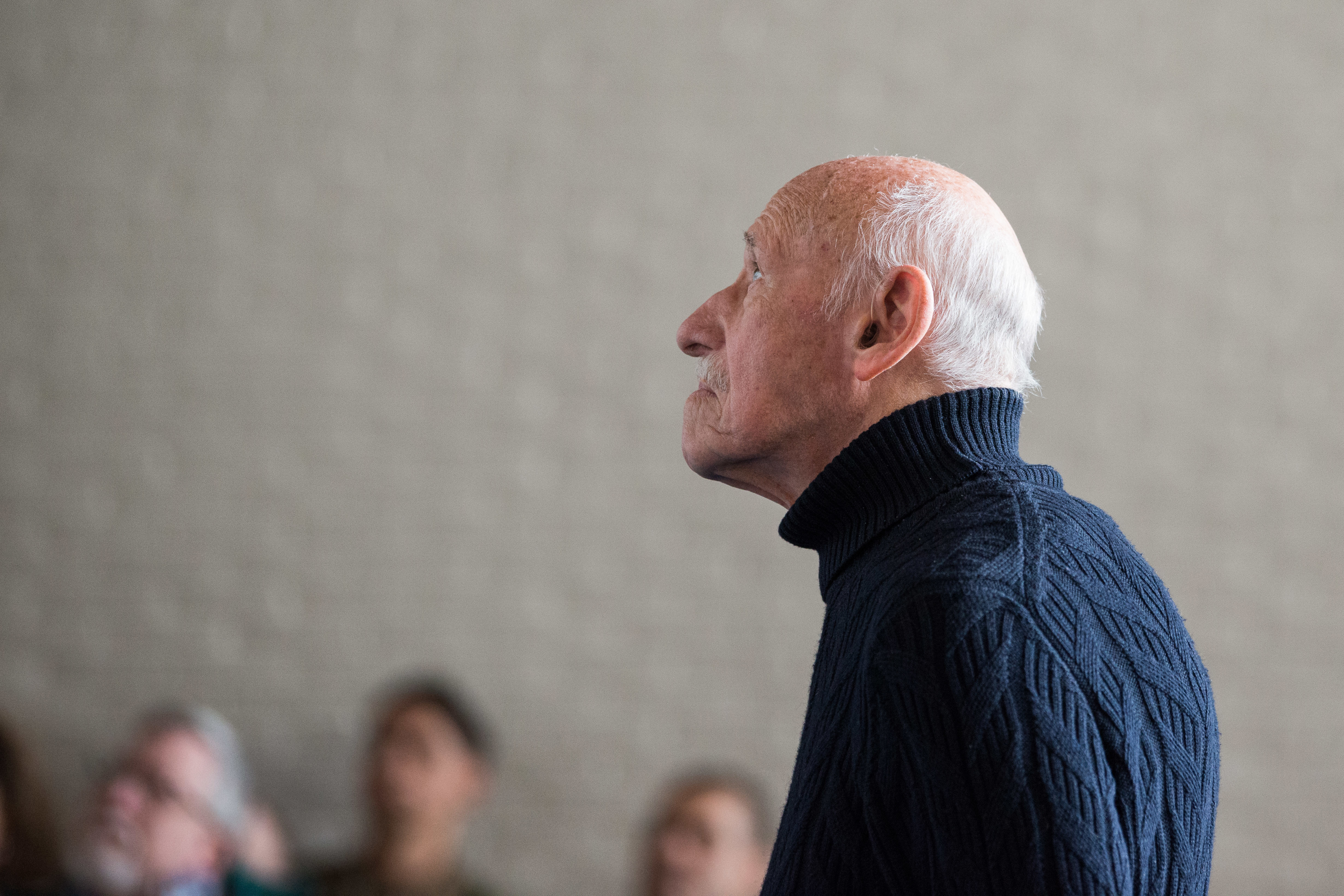
- Sobol, pictured at the 2019 Holocaust Remembrance Day commemorations at the Supreme Headquarters Allied Powers Europe in Casteau, Belgium
- Born: 26 June 1926; Paris, France
- Died: 17 November 2020 (aged 94); Brussels, Belgium
- Occupations: Advertiser, Holocaust educator

Paul Sobol (26 June 1926 – 17 November 2020) was a Belgian survivor of the Holocaust who was active in Holocaust education in Belgium. He was widely known as one of the country's foremost "passeurs de mémoire" (memory keepers) who spoke widely at schools. Born into a family of Polish-Jewish origin, Sobol spent several years in hiding with his family during the German occupation in Belgium before being denounced and deported to Auschwitz concentration camp on 31 July 1944 in the final convoy to leave the country. He was subsequently involved in the death marches to Gross-Rosen concentration camp and escaped on 25 April 1945 during a transfer to another camp. His parents and younger brother were killed during the same period.

== Life ==
Paul Sobol was born in Paris, France in 1926 into a working-class family of Polish-Jewish origin who had emigrated from Poland. The family emigrated to Brussels, Belgium in 1928 and were living in Belgium at the time of the German occupation in World War II. The family avoided the anti-Jewish measures imposed by the German authorities and went into hiding in 1942 when the mandatory wearing of the yellow star-of-David badge was imposed to mark out Jews. Sobol adopted the pseudonym Robert Sax to disguise his ancestry.

The family survived more than four years under the occupation, but were denounced to the German authorities and arrested on 13 June 1944. They were held in Mechelen transit camp. The entire family were deported to Auschwitz concentration camp on 31 July 1944 in the final convoy to leave Belgium. At Auschwitz, Sobol was assigned to a kommando (work detail) as a carpenter. After Auschwitz was evacuated ahead of the Soviet advance, Sobol was compelled to take part in a death march towards Gross-Rosen concentration camp where he was held with other prisoners in freight wagons bound for Dachau concentration camp. As he was being transported by rail on 25 April 1945, the train was attacked by Allied aircraft and Sobol escaped. He found shelter in a village with French prisoners and was liberated by American forces on 1 May 1945. He returned to Belgium and was re-united with his sister. His younger brother and parents, all of whom had been deported at the same time, were killed in the Holocaust.

Sobol married in 1947 and had two children. He worked in advertising and, in 1954, established his own advertising company. After initially being silent about his experiences, he became active in Holocaust education in Belgium from 1987 and spoke frequently in schools and was widely hailed as one of the foremost transmitters of memory (passeurs de mémoire) in the country by the time of his death. He was a member of the board of directors and the education committee of the Auschwitz Foundation. He published a memoir in 2010 entitled Je me souviens d'Auschwitz (I Remember Auschwitz).

Sobol died on 17 November 2020 of a ruptured aneurysm.

== Publications ==
- Je me souviens d'Auschwitz. De l'étoile de shérif à la croix de vie (Brussels: Racine, 2010), 221pp. ISBN 2-87386-680-2

== See also ==
- Henri Kichka (1926–2020), another Holocaust survivor active in Holocaust education in Belgium
