= Five Chimneys =

1946 book by Olga Lengyel

- First edition (French)
- Author: Olga Lengyel
- Original title: Souvenirs de l'au-delà
- Subject: The Holocaust
- Genre: Autobiography, memoir, novel
- Publisher: Editions du Bateau Ivre
- Publication date: 1946
- English publication date: 1995
- Pages: 240
- ISBN: 0-89733-376-4

Five Chimneys, originally published 1946 in French as Souvenirs de l'au-delà (Memoirs from the Beyond), is the memoir of Olga Lengyel about her time as a prisoner in the Nazi concentration camp Auschwitz.

== Background ==
Olga Lengyel was born on October 19, 1909, in Transylvania, then part of Hungary. In 1944, she was deported with her parents, husband and two children to Auschwitz-Birkenau. She eventually secured work in the infirmary at Auschwitz, a position which made her survival more likely. Olga survived Auschwitz, the only one of her family to do so. Her husband, Miklós Lengyel, died on the Death March. After the war, she emigrated to the United States via Odessa and France. Olga married Gustav Aguire and moved to Havana, but returned to New York City in 1962 and founded the Memorial Library in Manhattan. The mission of the Memorial Library is to support Holocaust education and to help teachers from across the United States as well as other countries promote an agenda for social justice. She died on April 15, 2001, in New York City at age 92.

In 2021, Holocaust scholar Lawrence Langer argued that Lengyel's book contained falsified stories, false memories, and embellishment.

== Book ==
=== Early life ===
In 1944, Olga Lengyel worked as a surgical assistant in Cluj (original name Kolozsvár), the capital of Transylvania, at the clinic owned by her husband Miklós, a Berlin-educated surgeon. As early as 1943, the Lengyels had heard about German atrocities against civilians in occupied territories. However, they refused to believe what they considered "fantastic rumors".

In May 1944, Dr. Lengyel was summoned to the police station in Cluj (despite being a Christian) and did not return. When Olga was told that her husband was to be immediately deported to Germany, she insisted that she and her children be allowed to join him. So that the family would not be separated, Olga's parents also joined Miklós at the train station for the trip to Germany. Suddenly, the station was surrounded by soldiers and the Lengyel family and other hapless passengers were forced into crowded cattle cars. By the time the train arrived in Auschwitz, on the seventh day, many of the deportees had died and the train seemed to Olga "as so many coffins".

=== Auschwitz-Birkenau ===
Upon arrival in Auschwitz-Birkenau, young men, including Miklós, were selected for slave labor, while Olga's parents and children were sent "to the left", that is, directly to the gas chambers. After Olga's group was admitted to the camp, she was told by old inmates that the burnt, sweetish smell came from the "camp bakery". Over the next several weeks Olga's naiveté gave way to the sober realization that Auschwitz-Birkenau was an extermination camp, where internees were murdered in the gas chambers and burnt in the crematoria when they were judged sufficiently enfeebled to be no longer useful for slave labor.

The conditions in the barracks were abominable, with 1500 persons eating out of twenty bowls which were used for chamber pots at night. The soup distributed at midday often could not be consumed without holding one's nose, while the six and a half ounces (180 g) of bread given each inmate in the evening contained a high proportion of sawdust. Olga noted that the camp was operated in a capricious, even contrarian manner, with women who were intellectuals, or were in poor physical condition, often given backbreaking physical work, while illiterates might be assigned office jobs.

At one roll call Olga wrapped herself in a woolen garment to combat the cold. This was considered a serious infringement of discipline, and Olga was selected for the gas chamber. The selected were surrounded by ethnic German internees and Stubediensts (inmate police) so that none would escape. When the gas chamber truck arrived, Olga strode away purposefully in the momentary confusion, carrying a stick (a symbol of authority at Auschwitz) she had found on the ground.

Three weeks after her arrival in Auschwitz, Olga was propositioned by a Polish prisoner, a carpenter who was working in the women's camp. He suggested a food for sex exchange, but Olga, though starving, demurred. Another woman in her barrack, who accepted the offer, contracted syphilis. Such arrangements were relatively common in the women's camp. Women with such "friends" were not only better nourished, but enjoyed a certain distinction because men were in such short supply.

After Olga had been several weeks in the camp, a call came for internees with medical experience. Olga was one of the women drafted to work at the new, but ramshackle, infirmary. With a staff of five for circa 35,000 women the work load was overwhelming. What disturbed Olga the most was the treatment of contagious cases, who were sent to the hospital where selections for the gas chamber were frequent.

Olga makes a distinction between organization (stealing from the Germans) and common thievery from fellow inmates. Items stolen from Kanada, the warehouses where goods stolen from new arrivals were sorted and stored, often wound up as bartered goods on the thriving black market in the camp, thus making the lives of internees more bearable. In this fashion, organization was ennobled as an act of social solidarity and resistance.

Olga and the other women in the infirmary were responsible for the delivery of newborns in the camp. However, unless a child were stillborn, both mother and newborn were sent to the gas chambers. Olga's companions wrestled with this ethical dilemma and eventually decided to save the mothers by inducing stillbirths. "And so, the Germans succeeded in making murderers of even us", mused Olga.

The mass murder of the Jews of Hungary in the summer of 1944 was without precedent even at Birkenau. Ten transports arrived daily and 400 Greeks from transports from Athens and Corfu were ordered into the Sonderkommando. Amazingly, the Greeks refused to kill the Hungarians. They declared that they preferred to die first.

Olga worked on various commandos, including the "Esskommando" (food service kommando) and the "Scheisskommando" (latrine cleaning detail). Both of these were preferable to senseless work requiring carrying stones, bricks or mud, then returning them to their original places. The purpose of such work was to wear down the inmates physically and mentally and to make them candidates for selection.

=== SS doctors ===
Although Camp Commandant Joseph Kramer, who once beat a woman infirmary patient to death with his truncheon, had certainly earned the designation "the beast of Auschwitz and Belsen", Olga singled out Dr. Joseph Mengele for special scorn. As chief selector for new arrivals at Birkenau Station, Mengele was the top producer of victims for the gas chambers. However, surprise selections were his specialty. He would show up at the infirmary or the hospital at his whim, whistling operatic arias, and order women to the right or left indifferently. Sometimes it was not possible to tell which the condemned group was until Mengele made his final pronouncement. "How we hated this charlatan!", writes Olga.

Mengele performed medical experiments on inmates. His passion was twins and dwarfs. When the Czech camp was exterminated, Mengele gave orders to spare a dozen sets of twins. When a family of five dwarfs arrived on one transport, Mengele was "beside himself with joy".

Several Nazi doctors carried out scientific experiments at Auschwitz for the benefit of the Wehrmacht, such as seeing how long a man could survive in extreme conditions. Thus, it was established, with scientific precision, how long it took death to come after scaldings at different temperatures. Other studies were inspired by "racial science", such as attempts to change the eye and hair color and studies on artificial insemination and sterilization.

=== Selections ===
Selections in the women's camp were made by SS Aufseherin Elisabeth Hasse and Irma Grese. The latter was visibly pleased by the terror her presence inspired in the women at roll call. She had a penchant for selecting not only the sick and the weak but any woman who had retained vestiges of her former beauty.

Grese inspired virulent hatred in Olga. Grese was only twenty two and had several lovers among the SS in the camp, including Mengele. After she strong-armed the inmate surgeon at the infirmary into performing her illegal abortion, Irma disclosed that she planned a career in the movies after the war. Olga felt that Irma's meticulous grooming, custom fitted clothes, and overuse of perfume were part of a deliberate act of sadism among the ragged women prisoners.

=== Auschwitz underground and revolt ===
As a member of the infirmary staff, Olga had relatively unrestricted access to various areas of Auschwitz-Birkenau and was recruited by the underground organization of Auschwitz. She participated in covert resistance activities, including the smuggling of explosives. Through her underground contacts she learned details of the gas chambers and crematoria. She even obtained extermination statistics from a French doctor attached to the Sonderkommando...1,314,000 gassed and cremated at Auschwitz-Birkenau in May–July, 1944 (a staggering total for just three months). On October 7, 1944, the Sonderkommando staged a revolt, blowing up one of the crematoria with explosives provided by the underground. The Sonderkommando of one crematorium used the general confusion to cut the barbed wire and escape. When the revolt was suppressed, using soldiers of the Wehrmacht with automatic weapons, 430 members of the Sonderkommando were executed.

=== Evacuation and the death march ===
After midnight on January 17, 1945, all patient records from the hospital were burned, and Olga and other hospital personnel were informed of the imminent evacuation of Auschwitz. However, patients were to stay behind. In a panic over the likelihood of being executed, if left behind, patients dragged themselves out of their beds wrapped in blankets. However, the SS chased all the sick and the weak back to the barracks. Olga, with the help of some friends, broke into the warehouse and liberated loaves of bread for the journey. The women, some 6,000 souls, were lined up in groups of five. "We were leaving Birkenau still alive!" marveled Olga.

During the first day of the March Olga counted 119 corpses, from previous columns, along the road in a 20-minute period and witnessed the execution of Dr. Rozsa, an elderly doctor who had fallen behind. Clearly, the SS were executing stragglers. This knowledge congealed her determination to escape. Olga and her friends Magda and Lujza tried to stay at the front of the column so that, if they had to stop briefly, they would not drop to the rear where SS guards, fearing that they would get 'rescued' by the Bolshevik Jews (as the German guards called them) liberating the camp, would shoot them.

=== Escape and liberation ===
The first night was spent in a barn, and Olga and her friends arose early because they wanted to be near the front of the column. A group of 25 prisoners led by the SS were impatient and started early, so that a large gap developed between the lead group and the rest of the women. Olga and her friends ran after and the lead group ignoring cries of "Stehen bleiben!" ("Stop!"), and with bullets whistling over their heads, they disappeared in the darkness. The three women spent the night in a barn and then in the house of sympathetic Poles.

When the last Germans came through the village, ahead of the Red Army, they took a large number of women from the village as hostages and Olga was one of the captives. Olga was bound to a cart by her hands and compelled to go on another forced march. Olga gnawed at the ropes tying her hands, and on the third night finally freed herself. The following night Russian troops liberated the area and Olga was saved.

=== Analysis ===
Originally published in 1946 in French, Five Chimneys is one of the most detailed personal accounts of Auschwitz-Birkenau. Olga was an inmate in the women's barracks at Birkenau for seven months in 1944-1945 and her narrative highlights issues of special importance to women. In this sense, Five Chimneys may be viewed as complementary to Primo Levi's If This Is a Man – Survival in Auschwitz or Elie Wiesel's Night.

It is telling that the Germans used deception to disguise the existence of the extermination camps. Thus, Olga was told that her husband was being deported to Germany (not Auschwitz) and she was not forbidden to join him. Allowing the families of arrested Jewish men to join them in transports to "work camps in Germany" (and to bring their valuables) was more effective (and lucrative) than a general roundup of Jews, which might have led to panic and resistance.

The deception continued inside the camps. Thus inmates of Auschwitz-Birkenau referred to the crematoria as "the camp bakery". The use of this euphemism was driven by the overriding need for discretion. Any inmates found spreading "false propaganda" were sent to the "camp bakery" themselves.

The naming of the Sonderkommando (special commando: the German word "kommando" meant "work group" and had nothing to do with the British Special Forces known as "commandos", and little to do with the Boer term "kommando" or "commando" used for a band of guerilla fighters in the Anglo-Boer War), whose job it was to burn the victims' corpses, and the designation of the cards of Schutzhäftlinge – protected prisoners marked for execution with the letters SB "Sonderbehandlung" – special treatment, was all part of the grand deception.

In fact, deportees who were designated for the gas chambers upon arrival perished without a trace. They were not names, simply crematoria statistics. Many of the ordinary inmates of Birkenau were not tattooed, and when they died of malnutrition or beatings or when they were selected for the gas chambers, they too died without a trace. Those who were tattooed were never assigned numbers higher than 200,000. As the prisoners died, the numbers were simply reused. Thus, the Germans hoped to obfuscate the magnitude of the crime.

Olga was not tattooed on arrival to the camp, but was tattooed later with the number 25,403 on her right arm when she obtained a position at the infirmary in Birkenau. A British military investigator mentions her tattoo in his report of May 4, 1945. Olga speaks of her tattoo in her book and the numbering process that she observed during her time in the camp.

Olga's group had their hair shorn by inmate barbers. However, a German officer intervened in Olga's case, saying: "Don't clip that one's hair". Olga, puzzled, but innately suspicious of being singled out, stood in line anyway and had her hair shorn. She muses, "one could expect no mercy (from the Germans), except at an ugly price". Her instincts were probably right; being an attractive woman she was, without realizing it, probably selected for the camp brothel. When the German officer returned and saw her bare skull, he was outraged and slapped her.

Criminals comprised a high percentage of camp functionaries, while university professors might be in the Scheisskommando (latrine cleaning detail). The Germans enjoyed these paradoxes and capricious decisions and ever-changing rules (whose infraction would be punished savagely) may well have been part of a deliberate attempt to induce apathy and lessen the likelihood of resistance.

Although the survival instinct is powerful, some inmates chose to sacrifice themselves rather than be reduced to brutes or even murderers. Thus, the example of the 400 Greeks who chose to die rather than work in the Sonderkommando is inspirational. In fact, it is these acts of humanity among the carnage which reinforced Olga's will to live and, in her words: "It is that hope which keeps me alive."

Five Chimneys is similar to Thanks to My Mother by Schoschana Rabinovici, in the acute powers of observation and memory of the respective authors. However, whereas some of the events, especially those of a sexual nature, were over the head of the eleven-year-old narrator of Thanks to My Mother, Olga Lengyel describes such events with an unflinching gaze. The physical examination (oral, rectal, vaginal, urethral) given to the nude women arrivals at Auschwitz-Birkenau, while German soldiers chuckled suggestively, is just one example.
