= Srul Irving Glick =

Canadian composer (1934–2002)

Srul Irving Glick CM
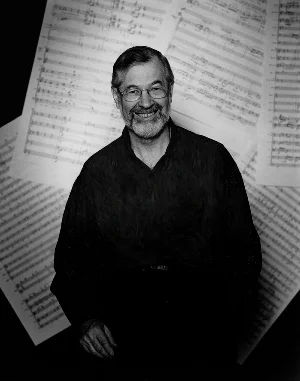
- Srul Irving Glick with Behind the Music
- Born: September 8, 1934; Toronto, Ontario, Canada
- Died: April 17, 2002 (aged 67); Toronto, Ontario, Canada
- Education: University of Toronto
- Occupations: Composer, radio producer, conductor, teacher
- Spouse(s): Dorothy Sandler, m. 1957; divorced Sara Wunch-Glick, m. 1996
- Writing career
- Notable awards: Member of the Order of Canada for "outstanding achievement, service to Canada and to humanity at large"

Srul Irving Glick CM (September 8, 1934 – April 17, 2002) was a Canadian composer, radio producer, conductor, and teacher.

== Life and career ==
Born in Toronto, Ontario, Glick was the son of David Glick, a Russian born cantor in Toronto. Clarinetist Norman Glick is his brother.

Glick began his training in music at The Royal Conservatory of Music, where he studied for two years. He then entered the University of Toronto where he graduated with a Bachelor of Music in 1955, and later a Master of Music in 1958. He was named an honorary Fellow of the Royal Canadian College of Organists in 1993. He studied music composition for two summers at the Aspen Music Festival and School under Darius Milhaud, and in 1959-1960 he continued his studies in Paris, France, with such masters as Louis Saguer and Max Deutsch. He was a teacher of theory and composition himself on the faculties of the Royal Conservatory of Music (1963-1969) and York University (1985-1986).

Glick was one of Canada's most prolific composers, who wrote in genres from chamber music to oratorio. He won numerous awards including the extraordinary Yuvel Award in 2000, presented by The Cantor's Assembly of America, for his "lifelong commitment to the composition of music that captures the heart and touches the soul"; the prestigious Ateret Kavod (Crown of Honour) Award in 2001 from the United Synagogue of America. He also received the J.I. Segal Award for his contribution to Jewish music in Canada; the Kavod Award presented by the Cantor's Assembly of America, "for his lifelong dedication to the music of the synagogue, to cantorial chant and to cantors"; The Solomon Schechter Award presented to the Beth Tikvah's music program by the United Synagogue of America; an Honorary Fellowship from the Royal Canadian College of Organists "for his contribution to musical life in Canada, and in particular to the music of the synagogue", and in 1995, a second gold Solomon Schechter award for the best musical program for a synagogue in North America.

In 1986, Glick left the CBC where he had been a classical music producer since 1962. His involvement in the field of production, recordings and programming won him seven Grand Prix du Disque and a Juno Award. In 1993, Glick received a Governor General's medal in honour of Canada's 125th anniversary of Confederation "for his contribution to Canadian culture", and in 1994 was appointed a Member of the Order of Canada for his "outstanding achievement, service to Canada and to humanity at large". The Queen Elizabeth II's Golden Jubilee Medal was conferred in 2002.

As one of Canada's composers, Glick's music continues to be performed regularly at home and abroad. His integration of contemporary music, Hebraic lyricism and classical composition techniques, formed into character-filled music, has won him considerable acclaim. His works have been published in Canada, the USA and the United Kingdom.

In 1989, a four-CD set of Glick's music was included in the Anthology of Canadian Music series. The Glick portrait in the Canadian Composers Portraits series was released in 2006.

Glick married Dorothy Sandler in 1957. They had three children together: Julie, Stefan, and Paula. They were married 32 years. He married Sara Wunch-Glick in 1996; they were married until his death in 2002.

He died in Toronto in 2002.

== See also ==
- Music of Canada
- List of Canadian composers
- I never saw another butterfly (song cycle to children's poems from the concentration camp at Terezin 1942–1944)
