= Some Girls, Some Hats and Hitler =

1984 memoir by Trudi Kanter

- Author: Trudi Kanter
- Cover artist: Ellen R. Sasahara
- Publisher: Scribner/Simon & Schuster
- Publication date: 1984
- Pages: 272
- ISBN: 978-1451688306
- OCLC: 776777120

Some Girls, Some Hats and Hitler is a 1984 memoir written by Trudi Kanter. The book was initially published in 1984 but was out of print till 1987 when it was discovered by Ursula Doyle in one of the bookstores in Cambridge, England. From 1987 to 2011 it was out of print again.

== Plot ==
The book tells a story of a hatmaker who is Jewish and falls in love with Walter on the eve of World War II. The story follows their lives before and during the war, starting from 1938 when the Germans occupy Austria, and ending with the defeat of Germany by the Allies in 1945. Before the war, she was married to another character, Pepi, divorcing him and ending her relationship with him as best friends. When the Germans invade her homeland, Austria, she emigrates to Czechoslovakia after they establish Kristallnacht, a series of anti-Jewish pogroms. Later on, she and Walter meet in Prague, the capital of Czechoslovakia, and obtain visas to Liverpool, England. There, Walter is detained and sent to an internment camp where he remained until the end of the war. After his release, Trudi marries Walter and he lives for 15 more years.

== Reception ==
The book received two and one-half stars on a scale of four from USA Today.
