= Henri Kichka =

Belgian Holocaust survivor and writer (1926–2020)

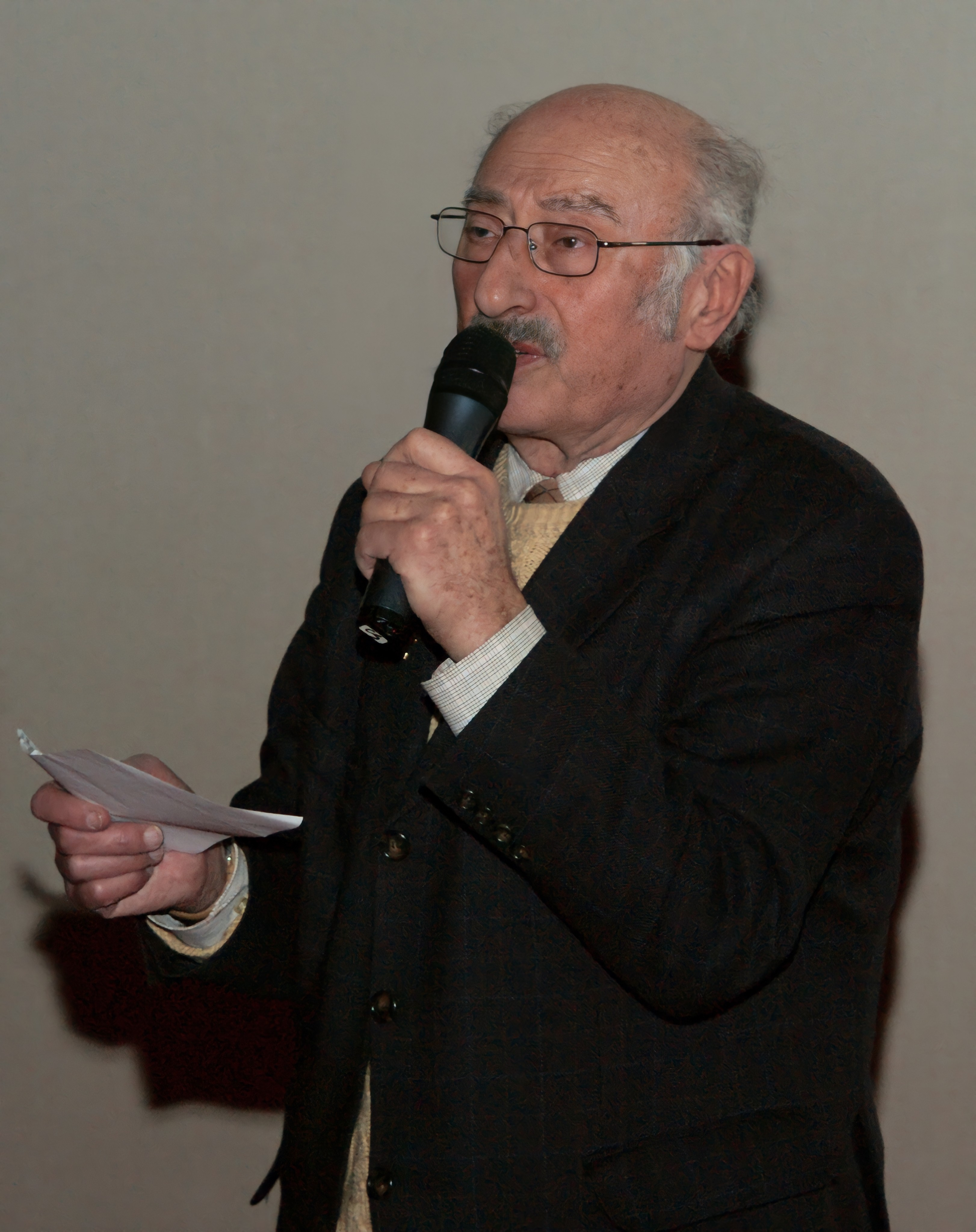
- Henri Kichka in 2010.
- Born: 14 April 1926; Brussels, Belgium
- Died: 25 April 2020 (aged 94); Brussels, Belgium
- Known for: Holocaust education
- Spouse: Lucia Świerczyński (m. 1949; died 2001)
- Children: 4; including Michel

Henri Kichka (14 April 1926 – 25 April 2020) was a Belgian writer and Holocaust survivor who was one of the leading figures in Holocaust education in Belgium. Kichka was the only member of his family to have survived the deportation of Belgian Jews to camps in Central and Eastern Europe. He began speaking on the importance of the memory of those who perished at the hands of the Nazis in the 1980s and spoke widely on his experiences to school audience. In 2005, published his autobiography, Une adolescence perdue dans la nuit des camps with a preface by the French historian Serge Klarsfeld. He is the father of cartoonist Michel Kichka.

== Biography ==
=== Childhood and the Holocaust ===
Henri Kichka was born in Brussels, Belgium on 14 April 1926 into a Jewish family which had emigrated from Poland. His father, Josek Kichka (Kiszka), had been born in Skierniewice in modern-day Poland, then part of the Russian Empire, in 1898, and fled the country in 1918 as a result of rising Polish anti-Semitism, moving to Belgium. His mother, Chana Gruszka, had been born in Kałuszyn in 1899 and arrived in Belgium in 1924. The couple renounced their Polish nationality in Belgium and became stateless. Henri was the eldest of the couple's three children. In 1935, the family moved to the Brussels municipality of Saint-Gilles where the family became moderately involved with the local synagogue. In school, Henri learned French, Yiddish, and German. He was forbidden from learning Polish.

Belgium was invaded in May 1940 and placed under military occupation. The family fled the invasion as part of the exode and ended up in French Third Republic, arriving in Toulouse. They settled temporarily in Revel and were ultimately forced into a refugee camp in Agde by the Vichy authorities. They moved to several different camps and were then released to Paris. On 1 August 1942, Kichka's sister, Bertha, received her summons to Mechelen transit camp ostensibly for compulsory labor service in Eastern Europe. The family accompanied her to the train station, and it would be the last time they saw her. Bertha Kichka was murdered upon arrival at Auschwitz concentration camp in August 1942. The rest of the family was deported in the Ninth Convoy of 12 September 1942. Kichka and his father were assigned to work on a railroad, and his mother, aunt, and sister were killed at Auschwitz on 14 September 1942. Henri and Josek were moved from camp to camp in Germany working as forced labourers and participated in a death march to Gross-Rosen and Buchenwald concentration camps in the final weeks of the war. Henri was liberated on 30 April 1945 but Josek had died at Buchenwald a few days earlier after having a foot amputated.

Kichka was sent to the airport in Weimar, where he stayed for 17 days, and was then transported back to Belgium by a truck. He weighed 39 kilograms (86 lb). He stayed at a reception center in Uccle, Brussels and was diagnosed with tuberculosis. He stayed at Brugmann Hospital in Alsemberg for 16 months. He joined an orphanage on 30 August 1946. He was the only child there who had survived the concentration camps, with the rest of them having been hidden children. He then rented an apartment with his friend, Beno Linzer and began as a leather worker. In 1947, he joined the Union sportive des jeunes Juifs. On 9 April 1949, Kichka married Lucia Świerczyński. He obtained Belgian nationality in 1952. He would later write that his adolescence was "lost" in the concentration camps.

=== Holocaust education ===
Kichka did not discuss what he had endured until the 1980s. The suicide of his son Charly changed his attitude and he became a prominent figure in Holocaust education in Belgium. He spoke widely on the subject in school and took part in school visits to Auschwitz and "educating the young about the Holocaust became his raison d’être". He published a memoir in 2005. Henri Kichka died on 25 April 2020 at the age of 94, eleven days after his birthday, in Brussels as a result of COVID-19 during the COVID-19 pandemic in Belgium.

== Publications ==
- Une adolescence perdue dans la nuit des camps. Waterloo: Édition Luc Pire, 2005.

== See also ==
- Paul Sobol (1926–2020), Belgian Holocaust survivor also active in Holocaust education
