= Leon Greenman =

British anti-fascism campaigner and survivor of Auschwitz

- Greenman with his family in 1942, in Rotterdam
- Born: 18 December 1910; Whitechapel, London, England (United Kingdom)
- Died: 7 March 2008 (aged 97)
- Occupation: Anti-fascism campaigner

Leon Greenman OBE (18 December 1910 – 7 March 2008) was a British anti-fascism campaigner and survivor of the Auschwitz concentration camp. He gave regular talks to school children about his experience at Auschwitz, and also wrote a book, An Englishman in Auschwitz.

The Holocaust gallery of the Jewish Museum London is dedicated to Greenman's story.

== Early life ==
Greenman was born on 18 December 1910 in Whitechapel in the East End of London, which at the time had many Jewish residents. He had two brothers and three sisters. His mother's family were originally Russian Jews. His mother died when he was two years old, and, aged 5, he went to live in Rotterdam with his father's Dutch parents. He trained as a boxer, and returned to London where he became a barber. He also enjoyed singing, and met his future wife Esther ("Else") van Dam at an amateur operatic society in the 1930s. They married in 1935 at Stepney Green synagogue.

After honeymooning in Rotterdam, where his wife also had family, the couple settled there. Greenman joined his father-in-law's bookselling business, often travelling to London. He considered returning to live in England in the 1930s, but decided to stay in the Netherlands after hearing Neville Chamberlain's promise of "peace for our time" on the radio in 1938. His son, Barnett, known as Barney, was born on 17 March 1940. Less than two months later, on 10 May 1940, the Nazis invaded the Netherlands.

== Second World War ==
Greenman held a British passport, and had expected that he and his family would be evacuated, but the staff at the British consulate in Rotterdam disappeared and he could not escape. Even so, he expected to remain safe, as the Geneva Convention protected enemy civilians. He gave his money and passport to a non-Jewish friend to keep them safe, but, fearing that Germans may find out that he had helped a Jew, the friend destroyed the passport. Greenman and his family were sent to the Westerbork transit camp on 8 October 1942 to be deported. Despite Greenman's protestations that he was British, and should be released, he and his family joined 700 others on a train out of the Netherlands in January 1943. Proof of his nationality arrived soon after they left.

Greenman described travelling for 36 hours across Europe with no food or water, to the death camp at Birkenau where upon arrival the snow outside the train was littered with suitcases abandoned by people who had arrived before them. His wife and son were taken to one side and were murdered in the gas chambers almost immediately. Greenman was sent in a different direction, one of 50 men selected to be labourers.

Greenman was tattooed on his arm with prisoner number 98288, and became a slave labourer. Surviving another sorting after 6 weeks, he worked as a barber, and sang to the kapos in the evenings. He was short – 5'2" or 158 cm – and slightly built, but he later attributed his survival to his physical training and useful skills. He made a promise to God that he would survive and tell others of the suffering in the camps.

He was transferred to the Monowitz industrial complex inside Auschwitz (also known as Auschwitz III) in September 1943, where he was subjected to medical experiments. When the camp was evacuated in early 1945, Greenman was sent on a 90-kilometre death march to Gleiwitz, and then taken in open cattle trucks to Buchenwald. There, Greenman found that the camp guards had fled on 11 April, and the camp was soon liberated by the American 3rd Army. Of the 700 on the train from Westerbork, only Greenman and one other man survived.

== Later life ==
Greenman had hoped to reunite with his wife and son, but learned after liberation that both had been killed at Auschwitz. Greenman would never remarry. Greenman returned to Rotterdam immediately after the war, and he moved back to England in November 1945. He took home uniforms and other mementos of his imprisonment. He lived in Ilford, working on a market stall for 40 years, and also performing as a tenor under the stage name "Leon Maure".

After hearing Colin Jordan, the leader of the National Socialist Movement, addressing a rally in Trafalgar Square in 1962, Greenman determined to tell his story to anyone who would listen. Late into his life, he would visit schools to bear witness to the Holocaust, showing them his tattoo and telling them his story. He donated photographs and mementos to the Jewish Museum in Finchley, which opened a permanent gallery showing his collection in 1995. An accompanying book, Leon Greenman Auschwitz Survivor 98288, was published in 1996. Into his nineties Greenman was to be found in the museum every Sunday, willing to talk to anyone about his experiences and he also guided tours around the camp at Auschwitz. The museum's collection was merged with that of the Jewish Museum in Camden (now London Jewish Museum), where upon reopening in 2010 Greeman's item formed a permanent gallery, the Holocaust Gallery.

He also campaigned against the far right, regularly receiving threats of violence as a result; in 1994, his home in London was attacked. In 1993, he joined the demonstration calling for the closure of the British National Party headquarters in Welling in south-east London. He also actively supported the Anti-Nazi League and Unite Against Fascism. In 2002, aged 91, he demonstrated against a visit to London by far-right Austrian politician Jörg Haider. He received an OBE for services against racism in 1988.

He suffered a heart attack in 2006, and received a pacemaker. He died in Barnet Hospital, having contracted pneumonia after an operation on a broken bone sustained in a fall. He was buried at East Ham Cemetery, near his father and two siblings. It was then suggested that a memorial should be erected in Valentines Park peace garden in Ilford. The memorial was funded by donations and was unveiled in 2009.

== See also ==
- Tex Banwell and Jane Haining: other British inmates of Auschwitz extermination camp
