= How Dark the Heavens =

Memoir written by Lithuanian Holocaust survivor Sidney Iwens

How Dark the Heavens: 1400 Days in the Grip of Nazi Terror
- Author: Sidney Iwens
- Subject: The Holocaust
- Genre: Autobiography, memoir, novel
- Publisher: Shengold Publishers, Inc., New York
- Publication date: 1991
- Pages: 289

How Dark the Heavens: 1400 Days in the Grip of Nazi Terror is a memoir written by Sidney Iwens, in which the author recounts the harrowing story of surviving the Holocaust as a Jewish teen under the German occupation of Lithuania. The book is reminiscent of Night by Elie Wiesel, 'A Lucky Child' by Thomas Buergenthal or of My Brother's Voice (2003) by Stephen Nasser.

== Background ==
Sidney Iwens (né Shaya (Shaike) Iwensky) was born on May 21, 1924, in Jonava, Lithuania to Jewish parents. His father, Moshe Iwensky had been head of the Folksbank, the nonprofit Jewish community bank in Jonava. The family also included Shaike's mother Mina and younger brother Ruvke, fifteen and sister Nehamah, thirteen.

== The book ==
The book chronicles the author's carefree life as a typical 17-year-old Jewish boy in the small town of Jonava, Lithuania, a town of about 4500 inhabitants, with c. 2500 Jews. However, on Sunday, June 22, 1941, a radio address by V. M. Molotov confirmed that the Soviet Union had been attacked by Germany. Soon it became apparent that much of the Jewish population of Lithuania was in full-fledged flight and the Iwensky family joined the exodus to Daugavpils, Latvia a city mistakenly thought to be beyond the immediate reach of the Nazi war machine.

After the refugees were overrun by the German army, the author's dance with death in the Daugavpils Prison, the Daugavpils Ghetto, the Citadel, amongst partisans of White Russia and Dachau Concentration Camp are chronicled in a calm, dispassionate narrative. 'How Dark the Heavens' won the 1991 August Derleth Non-Fiction book award.

=== Daugavpils Prison ===
The German occupation authority decreed that Jewish men were to report to the big marketplace in Daugavpils. All 16,000 men who reported, including Shaike were imprisoned in the Daugavpils prison, then taken to the killing ground in groups in a small park behind an iron gate. After some 15800 Jews were executed, it was Shaike's turn in the little garden. He and some companions were given shovels and ordered to dig graves, while other members of his group stomped on graves containing freshly killed bodies.

Miraculously, the executioners called a halt to the proceedings at sunset and led the remaining 200 men back to prison. The executions continued unabated the next morning, however, Shaike had found a hiding place in an empty cell and escaped execution by mixing with Jewish artisans spared in the initial slaughter.

=== Daugavpils Ghetto ===
Eventually Shaike found himself in the Daugavpils Ghetto. Here survival in the dreaded selections for death depended on obtaining a "Schein" or work permit. If one family member had a Schein, immediate family members, real or alleged, might be saved. In this fashion Shaike saved a young woman, by claiming she was his wife, and was himself saved on more than one occasion.

When new red Scheines were introduced they invalidated all previous Scheines. Lacking a red Schein, Shaike hid under a tin roof in the ghetto in an Aktion where the population of the ghetto was reduced from 5000 to a little over 1000. Emerging after two days from his molina (hiding place) Shaike volunteered as a skilled craftsman (painter) for the German army construction unit (Heeresbaudienststelle). This resulted in Shaike being kaserniert (barracked) in the Citadell and escaping the eventual liquidation of the last 600 souls remaining in the ghetto on May 1, 1942.

=== The Citadel ===
Not counting almost continuous hunger, life in the Citadell was relatively normal. There were no Aktions, SS guards or Latvian auxiliaries. Shaike and other Jews performed skilled labor under the supervision of regular German military, some of whom sympathized with the plight of "their" Jews and occasionally brought extra food to supplement the bread ration provided by the ghetto administration.

=== White Russian Partisans ===
Shaike and two companions took the opportunity to escape the Citadel when they were successful in securing guns, ammunition, map and compass and finally a Latvian guide who was in contact with the partisans of Bobily in White Russia. However, the stay with the partisans was short-lived because of a large scale operation of the German army whereby the forest hiding place of the partisans was surrounded. Shaike and his friend Max barely escaped the dragnet. Shaike and Max realized that without the protection of the partisans, life for a Jew in the world outside the ghetto was untenable. They were successful in hitching a ride on a freight train to the remote Siauliai Ghetto in Lithuania, which had not yet been liquidated and where conditions were rumored to be less harsh.

=== The Siauliai Ghetto ===
With the help of a Jewish policeman Shaike and Max were smuggled into the Siauliai ghetto as part of an outside work detail. Out of a prewar population of 8000 Jews in Siauliai, 4000 were still alive in the Siauliai ghetto, while all but three ghettos in Lithuania had been liquidated. Nevertheless, in the Children's Action of the previous Black Friday Ukrainian auxiliaries dragged 850 Jews, most of them children for shipment for execution. Two members of the Judenrat were cynically allowed to accompany the shipment "to see for themselves that the children were being well taken care of." Max believed that it was unlikely that the inevitable Action to follow would take place in the middle of winter (it was January 1944). This assessment proved correct. However, on Wednesday, July 5, 1944, the ghetto was surrounded by guards with machine guns and everyone was trapped. The remaining residents of the Siauliai ghetto were transported by train, under SS guard, arriving in Dachau Concentration Camp No. 2 on Monday, July 24, 1944.

=== Dachau Concentration Camp ===
Forced labor at Dachau Concentration Camp No. 2 varied in severity, but the numerous and lengthy Appells in threadbare clothing in all kinds of weather, continued reduction of bread rations and the thin soup ensured that by November 1944 some inmates had become Musel-manner (walking skeletons), so that, daily deaths were the norm. One interminable Appell lasted two hours, with several recounts, to the irritation and anger of the kapos and the Unterscharfuehrer. Eventually, it was discovered that a Musel-mann given up for dead, pulled himself up and dragged himself over to Appell. The enraged kapo clubbed him to death, saying "Now the numbers will balance." On Tuesday, April 24 Shaike and the rest of the camp was evacuated in a death march, where those unable to keep up were shot.

=== Liberation ===
On Thursday, April 26, 1945, the rag-tag band of inmates arrived at Allach transit camp. Too exhausted to continue, Shaike remained behind, while the rest of the inmates from Camp No. 2 moved out. Shaike noticed that many of the inmates at Allach were Musel-manner and was shocked to find after examining his own legs, thighs and buttocks, that he was one of them. On Monday, April 30, 1945, shells hit the camp hospital during the night and in the morning there were American soldiers at the camp gate. After 1409 days of German occupation, Shaike was liberated! He was the only survivor of his entire family.

== Analysis ==
How Dark the Heavens has been described as a story of "overwhelming courage, mental strength, and man's inhumanity to man."

This book is a testament to the idea that each holocaust survivor story is unique in the sequence of events, coincidences, blind luck and reasoned choices which allowed an individual to survive to liberation despite incredible odds. Nevertheless, Shaike's story is depressingly familiar, in that, the vast majority of Latvian and Lithuanian Jews did not survive.

The assembly line nature of the machinery of death is described in chilling terms in Shaike's story, as is the lack of empathy by German SS executioners and Latvian auxiliaries. Thus, during the execution of nearly 16, 000 Jewish men in the Railroad park adjacent to Daugavpils prison some were given shovels to dig fresh graves, while others were ordered to stomp on the graves containing freshly killed bodies.

A breakneck pace was enforced by the Latvian auxiliaries and the German SS officer in charge. If a Jew was not stomping vigorously enough, a jovial SS officer, whistling the tune of "Roll out the Barrel" (Rosamunde) would skip over to the unfortunate man, saying "Looks like you are too tired" and playfully shoot him in the back of the head.

It would be easy to dismiss Latvian and Ukrainian auxiliaries as traitors to their respective countries. However, John Lukacs points out that "In countries conquered by Hitler, Czechoslovakia, Denmark, Norway, Holland and Belgium. The purposes of "collaborationists" – that is, people who wished to exercise influence and power through their acceptance of German supremacy – were seldom separable from their respect for Hitler's Germany, which they believed was not only winning the war but deserved to win it, as indeed their former liberal and democratic systems had deserved to disappear." In other words, some collaborators were comfortable in their roles and sincere in their beliefs that their own governments were ineffectual and corrupt and German dominance was inevitable and even desirable. The elimination of the Jews of Europe in general and those of Eastern Europe in particular was not the complete Nazi ambition. The ultimate German goal is detailed in Himmler's secret document, approved by Hitler, of May 25, 1940 'Reflections on the Treatment of Alien Races in the East', which reads, in part, as follows: "Within a somewhat longer period, it should be possible to make the ethnic concepts of Ukrainians, Gorals and Lemkes disappear, in our area. What has been said for those fragments of peoples is also meant on a correspondingly larger scale for the Poles."

Shaike's survival against nearly overwhelming odds was not entirely a matter of luck. Fluent or conversant in Lithuanian, Yiddish, German and Russian, his language skills undoubtedly played a role. For example, speaking German allowed Shaike to approach and build sympathy with a few Wehrmacht soldiers barracked at the Citadel. When an outside work detail from the Siauliai ghetto was attacked by partisans, a German guard and a prisoner were killed. However, Shaike got up and shouted in Russian, "Friends! We are Jews!"

== Quotes from How Dark the Heavens ==
"It was our misfortune-our misfortune…that the Soviets occupied Lithuania in June of 1940, just a year before the Germans attacked. You know how the Lithuanians felt, with Lithuania having lost its independence, their hatred of communists had no bounds. The Jews, of cause, have always been accused of being communists…"

"It would have been so nice to believe that one was destined for a special purpose. It would have accounted neatly for the feeling of inviolability one had. But I believed many people, maybe even most people, had the same feeling of being "special"—then the time came, and they were shot."
