= I Never Saw Another Butterfly =

1994 compilation by Hana Volavková

- Cover of I Never Saw Another Butterfly
- Author: Hana Volavková
- Language: English originally in Czech
- Genre: History
- Publisher: Schocken
- Publication date: March 15, 1994
- Publication place: Czechoslovakia
- Media type: Print (Paperback)
- Pages: 128
- ISBN: 0-8052-1015-6
- OCLC: 26214051

I Never Saw Another Butterfly: Children's Drawings and Poems from Terezin Concentration Camp, 1942–1944 is a collection of works of art and poetry by Jewish children who lived in the concentration camp Theresienstadt. They were created at the camp in secret art classes taught by Austrian artist and educator Friedl Dicker-Brandeis. The book takes its title from a poem by Pavel Friedmann, a young man born in 1921 who was incarcerated at Theresienstadt and was later killed at Auschwitz. The works were compiled after World War II by Czech art historian Hana Volavková, the only curator of the Jewish Museum in Prague to survive the Holocaust. Where known, the fate of each young author is listed. Most died prior to the camp being liberated. The original Czech edition was published in 1959 for the State Jewish Museum in Prague; the first English edition was published in 1964 by the McGraw-Hill Book Company.

== Terezín ==
During World War II, the Gestapo used Terezín (German: Theresienstadt) as a ghetto. The majority of the Jews sent to the Theresienstadt Ghetto were scholars, professionals, artists and musicians. Before all out war broke out, the Nazis made plans to deceive International Red Cross inspectors into believing that Jews were being treated humanely. To accomplish this, when the Red Cross came through, inmates were encouraged to take up creative activities. They were given instruments and art supplies, encouraged to hold concerts too. Within the camp, parks, grassy areas and flower beds, concert venues and statues were installed to hide the truth; that most of the inmates were going to be killed. In fact, after the Red Cross left, most of the people who helped fool the Red Cross were immediately sent to Auschwitz. This façade masked the fact that of the 144,000 Jews were sent there, about 33,000 died, mostly because of the appalling conditions (hunger, stress, disease, and an epidemic of typhus at the very end of the war). About 88,000 were deported to Auschwitz and other extermination camps. At the end of the war there were 17,247 survivors.

Part of the fortification (so-called Small Fortress) served as the largest Gestapo prison in the Protectorate of Bohemia and Moravia, separated from the ghetto. Around 90,000 people went through it, and 2,600 of those died there.

It was liberated on May 9, 1945 by the Soviet Army.

== The play ==
I Never Saw Another Butterfly is also the name of a full length play and a one-act version by Celeste Raspanti. She based the play on a book of poetry and drawings made by the children of Terezín. The play centers on Raja Englanderova, one of the children who survived Terezín, and her family, friends, and classmates. She shares her story of living in the concentration camp, while retaining a world filled with butterflies and flowers with other children in the camp. Raspanti's play was adapted into a musical by Joseph Robinette and E. A. Alexander.

== Song cycle ==
In 1968 Jewish-Canadian composer Srul Irving Glick wrote the Holocaust-themed song cycle I Never Saw Another Butterfly for mezzosoprano (contralto) and orchestra or piano. The songs are based on children's poems from the concentration camp at Theresienstadt (1942–44).

The cycle consists of 6 songs:

1. To Olga
2. Yes thats the way things are
3. The little mouse
4. On a sunny evening
5. Narrative
6. The butterfly.

In 1972 the songs were issued on LP (with Maureen Forrester and John Newmark) by Canadian label Select (CC-15.073).

== See also ==
- Friedl Dicker-Brandeis
- František Bass
