= An Englishman in Auschwitz =

2001 book by Leon Greenman

- Author: Leon Greenman
- Language: English
- Subject: Auschwitz-Birkenau
- Published: 2001
- Publisher: Vallentine Mitchell
- Pages: 144
- ISBN: 0853034249

An Englishman in Auschwitz is a 2001 book written by Leon Greenman, a Holocaust survivor. The book details his experiences in the Auschwitz concentration camp.

The book is a result of the commitment of English-born Greenman to God "that if he lived, he would let the world know what happened during the war". In short, the book describes the reminiscences of his days of imprisonment in six concentration camps of the Nazis. Greenman describes the arrival of his family (consisting of himself, his wife, Esther, a Dutchwoman, and their three-year-old son, Barney) at the Auschwitz-Birkenau concentration camp in these words:

The women were separated from the men: Else and Barny were marched about 20 yards away to a queue of women...I tried to watch Else. I could see her clearly against the blue lights. She could see me too for she threw me a kiss and held up our child for me to see. What was going through her mind I will never know. Perhaps she was pleased that the journey had come to an end.
