= Anna Pawełczyńska =

Polish sociologist and author (1922–2014)

- Born: April 20, 1922
- Died: June 21, 2014 (aged 92)

Anna Pawełczyńska (April 20, 1922 – June 21, 2014) was a Polish sociologist and author.

Pawełczyńska was born on April 20, 1922. She was a member of the Armia Krajowathe in Poland during World War II. She was arrested and sent first to Pawiak and then to Auschwitz, and finally the Zeiss-Ikon group of the Flossenbürg concentration camp from which she escaped in 1945.After the war Pawełczyńska continued her education in Poland, studying with the sociologist Stanisław Ossowski, earning her doctorate in 1960. Her book Values and violence in Auschwitz was written in 1973 and published in 1979.

Pawełczyńska died on June 21, 2014.
