= Pavel Friedmann =

Jewish Czechoslovak poet who was murdered in the Holocaust

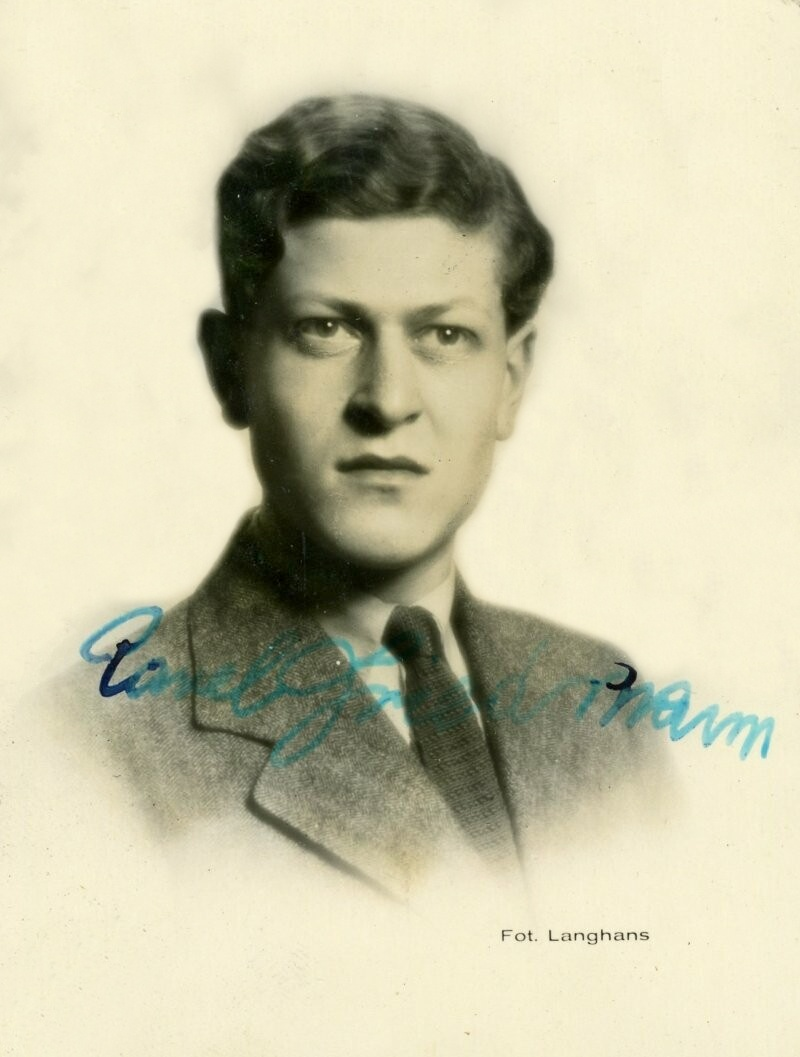
- Born: 7 January 1921; Prague, Czechoslovakia
- Died: 29 September 1944 (aged 23); Auschwitz concentration camp, German-occupied Poland
- Writing career
- Genre: poetry
- Notable work: "The Butterfly"

Pavel Friedmann (7 January 1921 – 29 September 1944) was a Jewish Czechoslovak poet who was murdered in the Holocaust. He received posthumous fame for his poem "The Butterfly".

== Biography ==
Friedmann was born in Prague. Little is known about his early life. When he was 21, the occupying German authorities had him transported from Prague to Theresienstadt concentration camp, in the fortress and garrison city of Terezín (German name Theresienstadt), in what is now the Czech Republic. His arrival was recorded on 28 April 1942.

On 4 June 1942 he wrote the poem "The Butterfly" on a piece of thin copy paper. Several of his poems were discovered after the liberation of Czechoslovakia and subsequently donated to the State Jewish Museum (now the Jewish Museum in Prague).

On 29 September 1944 he was deported to Auschwitz concentration camp, where he was murdered.

== The Butterfly ==
The text of The Butterfly was discovered at Theresienstadt after the concentration camp was liberated. It has been included in collections of children’s literature from the Holocaust era, most notably the anthology I Never Saw Another Butterfly, first published by Hana Volavková and Jiří Weil in 1959. The poem also inspired the Butterfly Project of the Holocaust Museum Houston, an exhibition where 1.5 million paper butterflies were created to symbolize the same number of children who were murdered in the Holocaust.

The Butterfly has inspired many works of art that remember the children of the Holocaust, including a song cycle and a play.

The Butterfly (English translation)

The last, the very last,
So richly, brightly, dazzlingly yellow.
Perhaps if the sun's tears would sing

against a white stone. . . .

Such, such a yellow
Is carried lightly 'way up high.
It went away I'm sure because it wished to

kiss the world good-bye.

For seven weeks I've lived in here,
Penned up inside this ghetto.
But I have found what I love here.
The dandelions call to me
And the white chestnut branches in the court.
Only I never saw another butterfly.

That butterfly was the last one.
Butterflies don't live in here,

in the ghetto.
