= Larry Duberstein =

American author

- Born: May 18, 1944 (age 82)
- Education: Wesleyan University; Harvard University
- Occupation: Novelist
- Partner: Lee Brown

Larry Duberstein (born May 18, 1944) is an American author. He has published nine novels, including Five Bullets, The Handsome Sailor, and The Marriage Hearse, and two volumes of short stories. Duberstein holds a B.A. (Phi Beta Kappa) from Wesleyan University and an A.M. from Harvard University.

== Personal life ==
The son of a lawyer and a schoolteacher, Duberstein was born in Brooklyn, New York, and grew up there and in Connecticut. For many years thereafter he lived in Cambridge, Massachusetts and now resides mainly in Hancock, New Hampshire. In parallel with his career as a writer, Duberstein has been a woodworker and a principle in two custom remodeling concerns in the Boston/Cambridge area—Clark & Duberstein (with Sam Clark) and Squarehorse Builders (with Chris Gorton). With his companion-in-life Lee Brown, he has three daughters—a teacher, a graphic artist, and a lawyer.

== Writing career ==
Duberstein's first novel, The Marriage Hearse, a New York Times New & Noteworthy selection, was called "one of the funniest, smartest, and most generous novels about marriage that I know" by Phyllis Rose. His second novel, Carnovsky’s Retreat, was hailed as "a virtuoso performance for Duberstein, who handles Oscar’s street-smart manner the way Heifitz handles a violin." Of Postcards From Pinsk it was said that "Mr. Duberstein has an eye and an ear for the truly comic, and he packs a lot of bittersweet humor and unfailing insight into a mere 244 pages." The short stories in Eccentric Circles ("one of the neglected treasures of the year") are "wryly affectionate studies that combine comic exaggeration with meticulous comprehension of character." The Handsome Sailor, described by F.X. Feeney as "fire stolen from heaven—a piece of divine mischief fit to please Melville himself," was a New York Times Notable Book. The Twoweeks "is the work of a master wordsmith whose intimate knowledge of the human heart is rivaled only by his perspicacity." Duberstein's latest novel, Five Bullets (2014) is perhaps his most personal and powerful, drawing upon the story of a family member who suffered terrible losses in the Holocaust yet achieved great success later in the U.S. Five Bullets has been called "a daring, elegant, introspective masterpiece" by eminent critic Theodore Rosengarten and "a powerful story of humanity and inhumanity" about "a memorable and complex character" by Kirkus Reviews. Of The Hospice Singer (forthcoming in May 2022), NPR book critic Joan Baum has said, "Duberstein tells this story with wit, originality, and great heart."

== Published works ==
=== Novels ===
- The Marriage Hearse (1987) ISBN 978-0932966766
- Carnovsky's Retreat (1988) ISBN 978-0932966834
- Postcards from Pinsk (1991) ISBN 978-1877946042
- The Alibi Breakfast (1995) ISBN 978-0759241596
- The Handsome Sailor (1998) ISBN 978-1579620073
- The Mt. Monadnock Blues (2003) ISBN 978-1579620936
- The Day the Bozarts Died (2006) ISBN 978-1579621346
- The Twoweeks (2011) ISBN 978-1579622244
- Five Bullets (2014) ISBN 978-0692255087
- The Hospice Singer (2022) ISBN 978-1-57869-085-5

=== Short stories ===
- Nobody's Jaw (1979) ASIN: B0006DYJ62
- Eccentric Circles (1993) ISBN 978-1877946202
