= Olga Lengyel =

Hungarian-born Holocaust survivor and writer

- Born: 19 October 1908
- Died: 15 April 2001 (aged 92)
- Notable work: Five Chimneys (1946)

Olga Lengyel (19 October 1908 – 15 April 2001) was a Hungarian Jewish prisoner at the Auschwitz-Birkenau concentration camp, who later wrote about her experiences in her book Five Chimneys. She was the only member of her immediate family to survive the Holocaust.

== Life and career ==
Lengyel was a trained surgical assistant in Cluj-Napoca (Romania - until 1940, Hungary 1940-1944), working in the hospital where her husband, Dr Miklós Lengyel, was director. In 1944, she was deported with her husband, parents and two children to the Auschwitz-Birkenau concentration camp; she was the only member of her family to survive. She wrote about her experiences in a memoir, Five Chimneys: The Story of Auschwitz, first published in France in 1946 as Souvenirs de l'au-delà (Memories from the Afterlife). A later American paperback edition was titled I Survived Hitler's Ovens; more recent editions have used the title Five Chimneys: A Woman Survivor's True Story of Auschwitz.

After the war, Lengyel emigrated to the United States, where she founded the Memorial Library chartered by the University of the State of New York. "The Library, headquartered in her elegant residence, is Olga's legacy, carrying on her mission of actively educating future generations about the Holocaust, other genocides, and the importance of human rights." She died of cancer in New York on 15 April 2001 at the age of 92.

=== 1946 Memoir ===
Olga Lengyel’s memoir is a foundational work of Holocaust literature, published before much was known about the Auschwitz concentration camp. It describes Lengyel's life through the 1944 Nazi occupation of Hungary, her deportation to Auschwitz with her husband and children, and her own survival as a medical assistant in the women’s infirmary in Birkenau. It is noted for its frank descriptions of women's experiences of gendered violence, the "Gray Zone" (Primo Levi's term) of prisoner-functionaries' complicity in order to survive, and its first-hand depictions of perpetrators such as Irma Grese, who mercilessly beat beautiful women in the camp. Lengyel's attempt to deal with her own guilt at having survived frames the work. In the first chapter she writes:

I cannot acquit myself of the charge that I am, in part, responsible for the destruction of my own parents and of my two young sons. The world understands that I could not have known, but in my heart the terrible feeling persists that I could have, I might have, saved them.

In Legyel's attempt to bear witness and publicize all that had gone on in the camp, she included some aspects she must have learned secondhand. In 2021, Holocaust scholar Lawrence Langer published a critical analysis of Lengyel's story, arguing it contained evidence of falsified stories, false memories or embellishment.

== Legacy ==
In 1954 Lengyel moved to Cuba with her second husband Gustav Aguire. They fled back to the United States during the Cuban revolution in 1959. The property of US citizens was expropriated by the Cuban government, including their art collection. Claims for its return have been ignored. In New York in 1962, Lengyel donated the Memorial Library, which is dedicated to commemorating the Holocaust, under the care of the State University of New York in Manhattan. In her will, she bequeathed her property in Manhattan and the right to the art collection to the Memorial Library.

Following the political détente between the US and Cuba in 2015, the legal claims to the art collection were memorialized by the Memorial Library. According to the list drawn up by Lengyel, the collection includes works by Hans Memling, Anthony van Dyck, Francisco Goya and Edgar Degas.

== See also ==
- List of Holocaust survivors
