= Schoschana Rabinovici =

Lithuanian writer

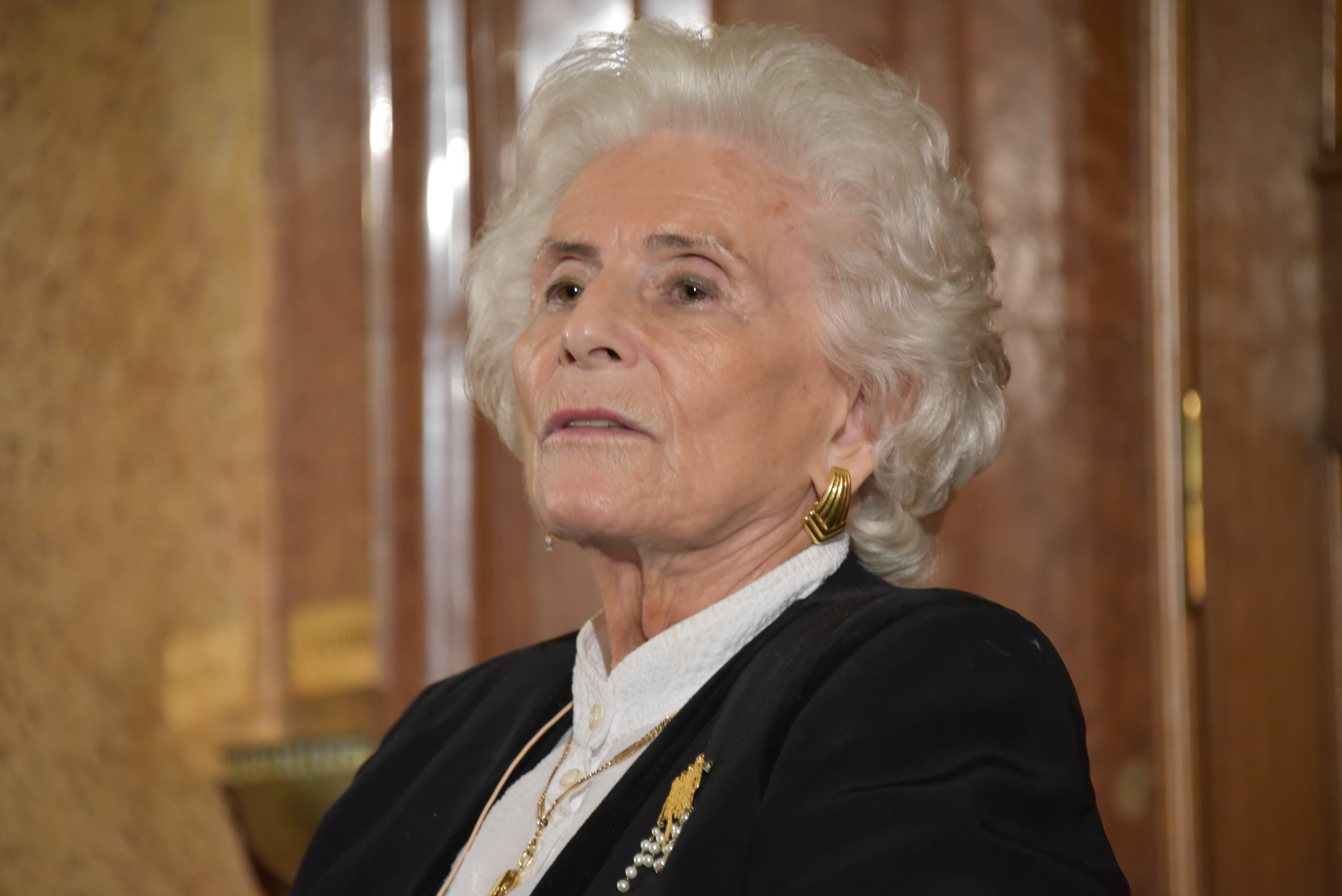
- The Last Witnesses, Burgtheater 2015
- Born: November 14, 1932; Paris, France
- Died: August 2, 2019 (aged 86); Tel Aviv, Israel
- Occupation: Author

Schoschana Rabinovici (née Suzanne Weksler; November 14, 1932 – August 2, 2019) was a Holocaust survivor and the author of the memoir Dank meiner Mutter (1994) which was published in the United States in 1998 under the title Thanks to My Mother. Of Lithuanian-Jewish heritage, she survived Vilnius Ghetto and the Kaiserwald and Stutthof Nazi concentration camps as a young girl (ages 8 to 12).

== Early life ==
Susanne Weksler was born in Paris on November 14, 1932, where her parents were completing their studies. After the Wekslers returned to Vilnius, Weksler attended Jewish school until the German occupation of the city in June 1941. Weksler's parents owned Bon-Ton, a clothing store in Vilnius. Her father, Isak Weksler, and mother, Raja Indurski Weksler, were divorced when Weksler was just seven years old. A short time after Bon-Ton was nationalized during the Russian occupation of Vilnius (1940–1941), Raja married Julek Rauch, a Polish Jew from Przemyśl, where Julek had attended a German school.

Grandfather Weksler and grandfather Indurski owned businesses in Vilnius and, as they were considered wealthy, the Indurski and Weksler families barely avoided deportation to Siberia during the Russian occupation.

== German occupation ==
Two days after Germany invaded the Soviet Union, when Weksler was eight years old, Germans occupied Vilnius and her father, Isak Weksler was arrested as a Jew and was eventually murdered in the Ponary massacre.

In early September 1941 Weksler and her extended family were incarcerated in the Vilnius Ghetto. Upon liquidation of the ghetto beginning on September 24, 1943, Suzanne and Raja survived a brutal selection in the Christian Rasos Cemetery. Raja passed the selection of those fit for work with Suzanne hidden in a canvas bag she carried on her back. They were sent for forced labor to the Kaiserwald concentration camp near Riga, Latvia. By standing on her toes at roll call and later wearing a turban and high heels, the 11-year-old appeared tall enough to pass as an adult. During one selection of the weak for executions, the Wehrmacht sergeant in charge of the work detail grabbed Weksler's arm and forced her into a coal bin, which stood next to the stove in his room, thus saving her life.

Upon the liquidation of Kaiserwald, Weksler and her mother were transported to the Stutthof concentration camp on October 1, 1944. Conditions at Stutthof were brutal and sick and weak prisoners were routinely gassed or given lethal injections. Upon the approach of the Red Army, Stutthof was evacuated and Suzanne and Raja barely survived the eleven-day death march, in snow and freezing temperatures to the Tauentzien Camp (present-day Tawęcino), near Lauenburg (Lębork). Suzanne became ill and was too sick to join the evacuation march from Tauentzien on March 7, 1945. When the camp was liberated by the Red Army, Suzanne was in a coma. It was a full week before she recovered consciousness.

== After liberation ==
Of her extended family of some thirty individuals only Suzanne, her mother and an uncle survived. After the war Weksler attended school in Poland and in 1950 she immigrated to Israel, serving in the Israel Defense Forces until 1952. She married David Rabinovici in 1953 and had two sons, born in 1955 and 1961. Suzanne Weksler, now Schoschana Rabinovici, lived in Tel Aviv and Vienna since 1964.

== Memoir ==
Described as "Particularly grim, even for a Holocaust memoir", Thanks to My Mother was described by one reviewer as "one of the most moving memoirs I have ever read of the Holocaust". The same reviewer writes that readers whose interest include Holocaust testimonies and are "mentally prepared for the harshness of Rabinovici's experiences, will come away with renewed appreciation of the extraordinary fortitude required to survive those dire times". The book gives a rare, detailed view of Jewish life in Vilnius, Lithuania during German occupation and contains gritty descriptions of life in the Vilnius Ghetto and the circumstances of those deported from the ghetto for slave labor in Germany. It is written from the viewpoint of a young girl from the age of about eight to twelve. Writes JWeekly.com..."It is also the story of Raja Indursky-Wexler’s profoundly transcendent love for her daughter…the daughter's memoir is at once riveting, blood-chilling, heartbreaking and, ultimately, awe-inspiring." The book is designated as an American Library Association notable book and is the 1999 winner of the Mildred L. Batchelder Award. The award seeks to recognize translations of children's books into the English language (in this case by James Skofield from the original German), with the intention of encouraging American publishers to translate high quality foreign language children's books.
