= Bödeker =

Bödeker, Böddecker, Bödecker, Boedecker, Boeddecker or Boedecker is a German surname. Notable people with the surname include:

- Anna Whitehead Bodeker (1826–1904), American suffragist
- Bill Boedeker (1924–2014), American football player
- Erich Bödeker, German sculptor
- Friedrich Bödeker (1867–1937), German botanist
- Henry Albert Boedeker (1872–1940), physician and early settler in British East Africa
- N. M. Bodecker (d. 1988), American illustrator
- Philipp Friedrich Böddecker (1607–1683), German court organist and composer
- Ralf Bödeker (born 1958), German footballer
- Stephan Bodecker (1384–1459), 37th Bishop of Brandenburg and a Christian Hebraist
- Sybille Bödecker (born 1948), German slalom canoeist
