= Marie Sophie Hingst =

German historian, blogger and fraudster (1987–2019)

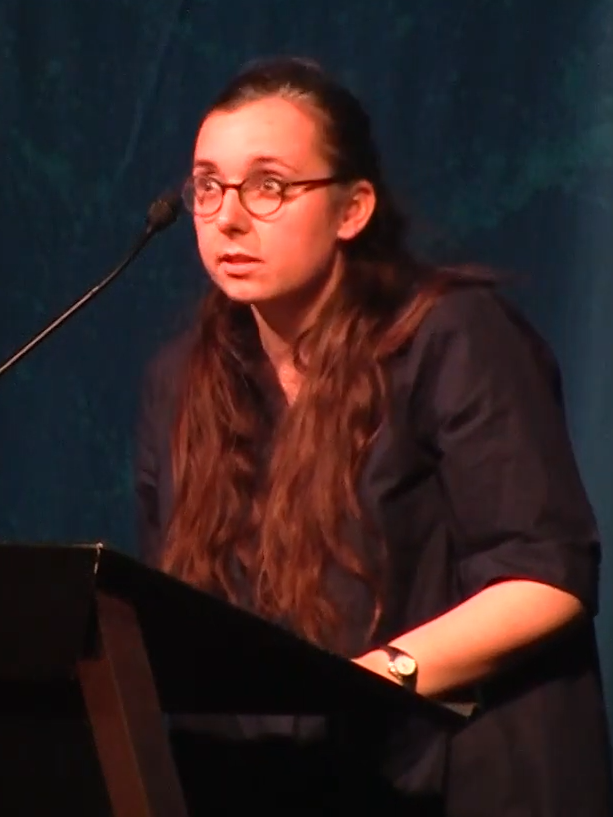
Hingst in 2018

Marie Sophie Hingst (20 October 1987 – 17 July 2019) was a German historian and blogger who falsely claimed to be descended from Holocaust survivors. Born in Wittenberg to a Protestant family, she fabricated a Jewish background and sent documentation for 22 misrepresented or non-existent relatives, whom she claimed were Holocaust victims, to the official Holocaust memorial Yad Vashem.

Hingst maintained the blog Read On, My Dear, Read On, writing about her supposed Jewish background and identity, along with her experiences as a German expatriate in Ireland, where she moved in 2013. The blog received hundreds of thousands of views, and she was awarded "Blogger of the Year" in 2017 by Die Goldenen Blogger (The Golden Bloggers).

Throughout her life, Hingst falsified much of her background, connections, and achievements. She claimed a background in sex education, having purportedly founded a hospital in New Delhi and worked in sex education outreach to refugees in Germany. Hingst used her fraudulent credentials to gain awards and recognition; alongside her "Blogger of the Year" recognition, she wrote for the German newspaper Die Zeit, and was one of the winners of the 2017 Financial Times Future of Europe project. In June 2019, Der Spiegel journalist Martin Doerry exposed Hingst's claims as false with the assistance of a team of historians and archivists. She was castigated in the German media, leading to the destruction of her reputation.

A month after Doerry exposed her, Hingst committed suicide on 17 July 2019 at the age of 31. Her fraud and death attracted attention across Europe. German and Irish coverage of Hingst differed: the former focused on the extreme sensitivity of the subject she had lied about and how she should have been stopped earlier, while Irish media lamented her mental health and accused Doerry of ignoring her vulnerability. She was compared to other women who had been uncovered as misrepresenting their backgrounds, such as Anna Delvey and Rachel Dolezal. The particular similarity between Hingst and Dolezal, as people who claimed to have faced ethnic discrimination, sparked discussion of the role of identity politics in such claims.

== Early life, blogging, and career ==
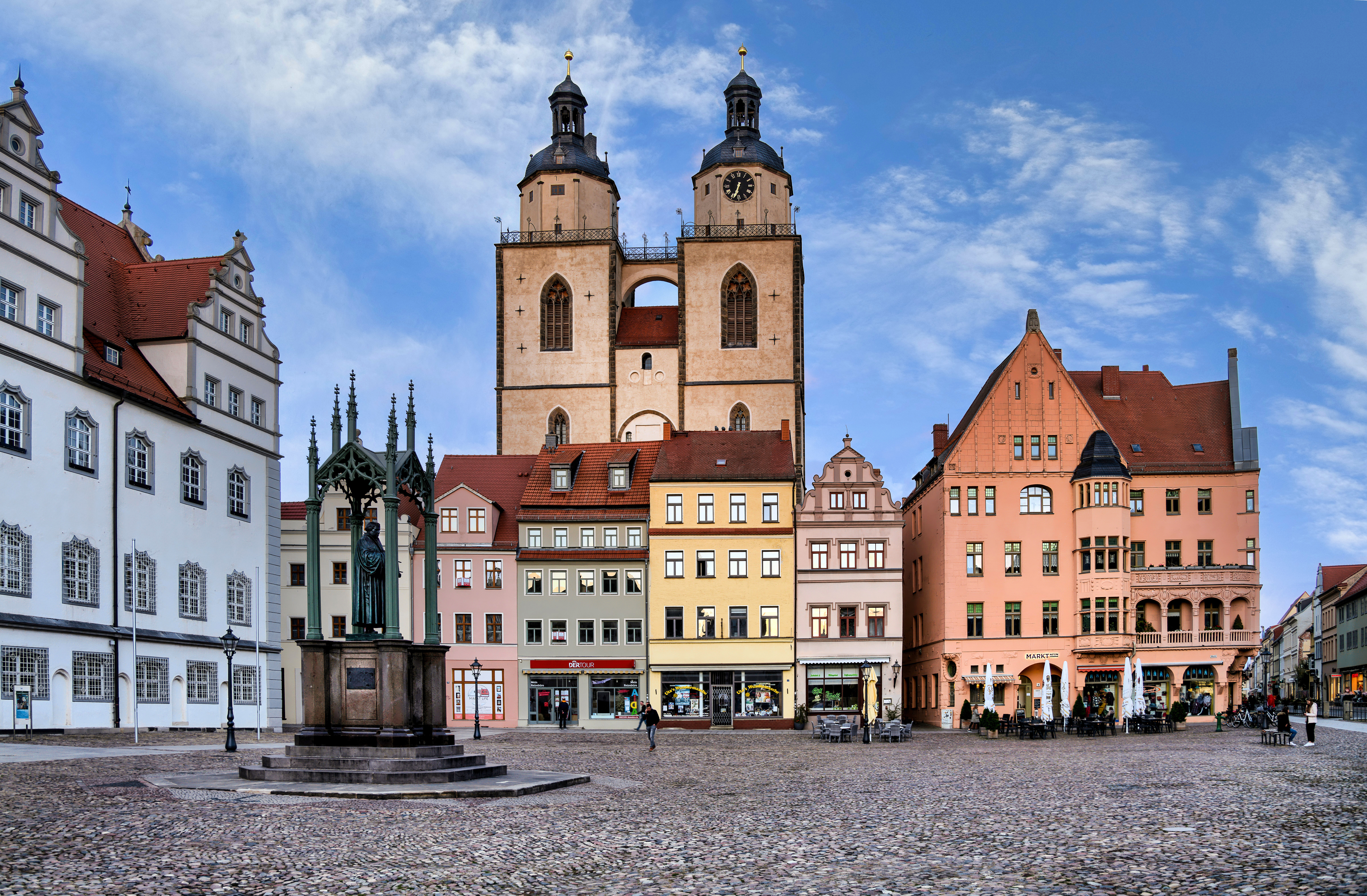
Wittenberg, Hingst's hometown

Marie Sophie Hingst was born on 20 October 1987 in Wittenberg, a town in Saxony-Anhalt in what was then the German Democratic Republic (present-day eastern Germany). She grew up in a university-educated family from a Protestant Christian background; her grandfather was a pastor. After graduating from the Liborius-Gymnasium in Dessau, Hingst studied history at university in Berlin, Lyon, Los Angeles, and eventually Dublin, where she moved in 2013. She attended Trinity College Dublin, where she completed a Ph.D.; from 2015 to 2017, she was a fellow at the Trinity Long Room Hub Arts and Humanities Research Institute. In 2013, she founded the blog Read On, My Dear, Read On, where she wrote about her life as a German expatriate in Ireland and her purported Jewish background and identity. Hingst was awarded "Blogger of the Year" in 2017 by Die Goldenen Blogger (The Golden Bloggers), and Der Tagesspiegel reported in June 2019 that Read On, My Dear, Read On had 240,000 "regular readers".

Hingst had no Jewish ancestry on either side of her family. She claimed her mother was a French-Israeli Médecins Sans Frontières worker who committed suicide when Hingst was 16, and that her non-Jewish birth mother was her stepmother. She additionally constructed a Jewish background for her paternal grandparents, describing them as Holocaust survivors whose parents perished in the genocide. Hingst reported 22 relatives who had allegedly died in the Holocaust to Yad Vashem, Israel's official Holocaust memorial; most of these people were later determined to have never existed, and the remainder to not have been from a Jewish background or not to be Holocaust victims. According to later reports, she constructed this backstory shortly after her move to Dublin.

The contents of Read On, My Dear, Read On detail this supposed family history. Hingst claimed that her paternal grandparents were each the sole survivors of their families; her grandfather was purportedly the youngest of five sons, and her grandmother the youngest of five daughters, both of whom lost their parents and older siblings in the Auschwitz concentration camp. She gave specifics of when many of her relatives had been murdered that contradicted historical dates, such as reporting the deportation of her great-grandfather and his family as occurring in February 1940, when deportations of Jews to Auschwitz only began in March 1942. Hingst's statements were at times inconsistent with each other; her claims about how many relatives were murdered differed between her blog and her Yad Vashem statements. A focus of the blog was her grandmother, whom she presented as a strong-willed woman who rejected "the constraints of Jewish tradition". Hingst's grandmother reportedly ran yearly summer tea parties for fellow Auschwitz survivors in Germany; Hingst, as a child, was said to have arranged invitations for such events and sat in on them to listen to the narratives of the guests.

This backstory was not the only focus of the blog. When the Turkish-German journalist Deniz Yücel was imprisoned in Turkey in 2017, Hingst sent him daily postcards expressing her support. She posted scans of each postcard on Read On, My Dear, Read On, and kept copies for herself, which she gave to Yücel after his release. Hingst also wrote to Meşale Tolu, another German journalist imprisoned in Turkey along with her young son.

Hingst additionally fabricated several life accomplishments. She stated on her blog that in 2007, at the age of 19, she had founded a hospital in New Delhi that provided sex education. This purported accomplishment led to her writing for Die Zeit about her experiences, under the pseudonym Sophie Roznblatt. Her purported experiences providing sex education included working at a doctor's office in Wittenberg, where she specialized in responding to anonymous sexual education questions from refugees.

In addition to her "Blogger of the Year" award and Die Zeit publication, Hingst was a winner of the Financial Times Future of Europe project in 2017. Her winning essay, "Europeans should not abandon a collective identity", was published on their website. In her acceptance speech, she referred to her Jewish family. At various points, she was a panel moderator for meetings of the Memorial to the Murdered Jews of Europe, a member of Trinity College's Jewish Society, and an employee at the Selma Stern Center for Jewish Studies Berlin-Brandenburg. In 2018, Hingst started a viral Twitter hashtag called #KunstGeschichteAlsBrotbelag ("art history on a sandwich"), based around replicating famous artworks and historical photographs with food. Following the hashtag's popularity, she published a photo-book on the subject with DuMont Buchverlag in March 2019. The book was commercially successful. At the time of the Der Spiegel publication in June 2019, she was working at Intel in Dublin as a self-described "disruptor", a role she ascribed to her success on social media.

== Der Spiegel outing ==
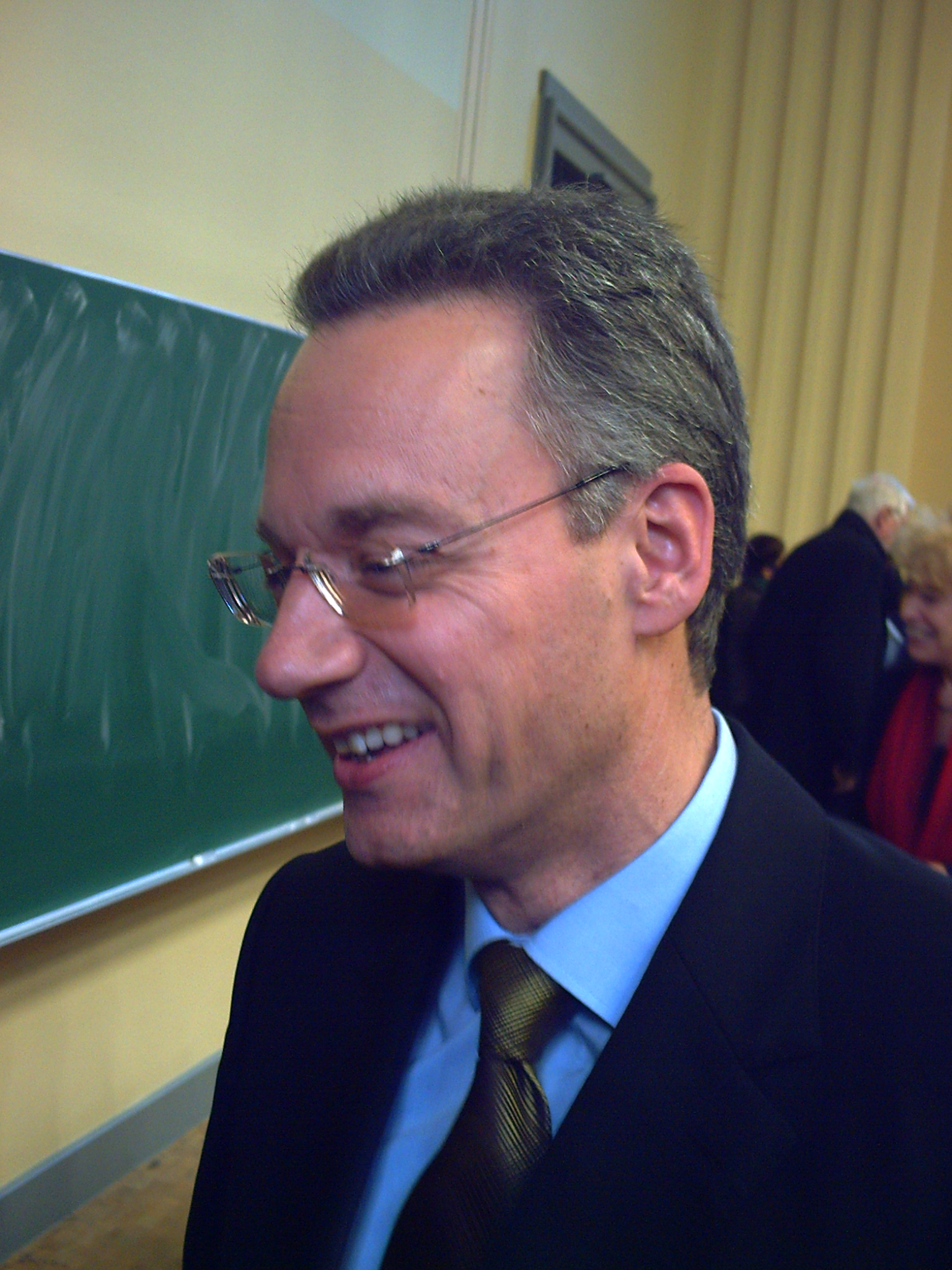
Martin Doerry, who reported on Hingst's claims

Suspicions were raised about Hingst's blog posts by readers, who noticed "inconsistencies" in her claims. In 2018, the historian Gabriele Bergner, working alongside a lawyer, an archivist, and a genealogist, examined the details of Hingst's blog posts with other researchers. That December, Bergner contacted Der Spiegel journalist Martin Doerry with her impression that Hingst was misrepresenting her background. Doerry, whose grandmother Lilli Jahn had herself been murdered at Auschwitz, was sought for his experience in this area; he had helped expose Wolfgang Seibert, a leader in Pinneberg's local Jewish community, as the perpetrator of a similar fraud the year before. Research by Bergner, Doerry, and archivists from the Stadtarchiv Stralsund throughout the first half of 2019 led to the conclusion that Hingst's claims of descent from Holocaust survivors were fraudulent.

In June 2019, Doerry published "The Historian Who Invented 22 Holocaust Victims", an exposé of Hingst's claims, on Der Spiegel's website in German and English. The story presented research that indicated that Hingst had falsified her Jewish background, medical work in India, and sex education outreach to refugees in Germany. The Der Spiegel piece was picked up by other news outlets across the German-speaking countries of Europe; Der Tagesspiegel compared her to Russian-German con artist Anna Sorokin (AKA "Anna Delvey"). Neue Zürcher Zeitung discussed the implications of the case for editorial reliability, noting that Hingst had been published in Die Zeit and referencing that Der Spiegel had themselves been taken in by the fraudulent journalist Claas Relotius the preceding year.

Hingst took down her blog and retained legal counsel, who made a statement to the press that Read On, My Dear, Read On "claimed a significant degree of artistic freedom". In a statement to Trinity's student newspaper The University Times, she "strongly den[ied] all accusations" by Der Spiegel and said she had "never falsified anything". Die Zeit retracted her article; other organizations that had granted her platforms, such as Südwestrundfunk and Deutschlandfunk Nova, similarly retracted support for her. She was stripped of her Goldenen Blogger prize. A German Wikipedia article was created, describing Hingst as a "blogger and fraudster".

After Doerry's piece was published in Der Spiegel, Derek Scally of The Irish Times interviewed Hingst, intending to publish an article on her. Scally found Hingst emotionally distressed and struggling to handle the negative attention placed upon her by the international coverage of her fraud. He described her as "agitated and wounded, yet intelligent and even humorous"; she expressed her deep distress at the Der Spiegel article, describing herself as feeling "skinned alive", and continued to hold to the background and accomplishments she had presented on her blog despite the evidence to the contrary. Scally informed his employers and Doerry that he was uncomfortable writing about Hingst for The Irish Times; he feared further publications would jeopardize her mental health, and worried he might be the last person to see her alive.

== Death and aftermath ==
Without warning, from her pocket, she produced a leatherette wallet, unzipped it and took out something that she pressed into my hand. I unfolded a yellow cloth star with "Jude" written in the centre: one of the yellow stars all Jews were forced to wear under the Nuremberg Laws.

"This star and a smashed pair of glasses were all [my grandmother] had after Auschwitz," she said in a low voice. "Touch it and please ask me again if I'm staging things. This is what you're doing to me, forcing me to say this."

I could sense her looking at me, waiting for a reaction. I thought first of the Holocaust, then I thought of eBay. But I kept my expression neutral as I handed it back.

— Derek Scally, The Irish Times

Hingst was found dead in her Dublin apartment on 17 July 2019 at the age of 31. Her death was ruled a suicide.

Weeks after Hingst's death, Scally published an article for The Irish Times on his own interview and interactions with her mother, Cornelia, leading up to her death. Cornelia described her daughter as possessing "many realities, and I only have access to one". Doerry spoke to The Irish Times under the promise his statements would not be published; he instead dictated a one-line statement that "Der Spiegel will not comment on the article and regrets the death". Doerry soon after published "Why I Was Right to Report on Marie Sophie Hingst's Lies" for Der Spiegel, where he analysed Hingst's death and the public reaction and concluded his reporting was necessary to prevent a "mockery" of Holocaust victims.

=== National differences ===
The difference between the Irish and German coverage of Hingst's fraud and death attracted media attention across Europe. Jennifer McShane, writing for the Irish IMAGE Magazine, criticised Der Spiegel for apparently failing to recognize Hingst's mental distress while describing Scally's piece for The Irish Times as "compassionate and moving". Avner Ofrath, a scholar of Mediterranean Jewish history at the University of Bremen, wrote about Hingst for the Switzerland-based European Journalism Observatory. He highlighted the enormity of Hingst's fraud, criticising Anglophone writers who attacked the severity of the German coverage for not realizing how offensive many German commentators found her claims. Ofrath particularly spoke against commentators who had ascribed Doerry's coverage of the case in part to having lost relatives of his own in the Holocaust, describing the attempts to draw such links as "reveal[ing] an astonishing lack of sensitivity". Annika Schneider of Deutschlandfunk summarized the different Irish and German perspectives on the case as the German media focusing on how Hingst's fraud should have been stopped, while the Irish media focused on her as a person and the intensity of her psychological distress.

=== Journalistic ethics ===
The coverage of Hingst's life and death raised questions of journalistic ethics. In response to Scally's determination to remain in contact with Hingst's mother after the interview, the German professor of journalism Klaus Meier lauded his ethical commitment but deemed it a level of emotional labour that would not be possible for every case. He also discussed the significant concerns raised by reporting on a mentally vulnerable person. In Hingst's case, Meier and Schneider argued reports were justified in the public interest; Schneider felt that due to the extent of the fraud, it would not have been possible to anonymize the fraudster.

Other discussions of the case revolved around Der Spiegel's own history of fabrication. Claas Relotius had been fired from the publication in 2018 for the falsification of at least fourteen articles; critics accused the magazine of attempting to launder its image. Doerry responded to these challenges by noting the prior researchers, like Bergner, who had also uncovered her fraud, and said he had been sought out specifically for his previous work on similar cases. Relotius had himself been the subject of arguments that the perpetrators of such fraud cases are unable to withstand the criticism they receive when uncovered. Christian Vooren, writing for Der Tagesspiegel, compared their situations in his obituary for Hingst; he also felt that the nature of the situation made reporting necessary, but quoted Cornelia Hingst's accusation that Doerry had not "seen the person behind the facts" when writing his exposé.

Deniz Yücel, a Turkish-German journalist who spent 336 days incarcerated in Turkey under suspicion of espionage, received postcards from Hingst during his imprisonment. Following her suicide, he wrote in a column for Die Welt that Doerry had contacted him during the research into her fraud. Yücel admitted that the severity of the situation forced him to reconsider his prior opinions of her, but felt critical of Doerry's attitude towards the situation and accused him of lacking empathy. Doerry reportedly disapproved that Yücel still sympathized with Hingst and expressed gratitude for her outreach to him; Yücel, for his part, felt that Doerry seemed overly enthusiastic about the case and narrow-mindedly focused on exposing Hingst's fraud.

In a column for the Süddeutsche Zeitung, Carolin Emcke was critical of the German coverage while simultaneously recognizing the co-existing duty of care to genuine Holocaust victims. She posited that the situation had no easy outcomes, being deeply regretful of Hingst's suicide, but also concerned about the harm her fraud had done to living Holocaust survivors and the memory of the victims. Scally and Emcke both attended Hingst's burial, hosted by Lea Rosh, chairwoman of the Memorial to the Murdered Jews of Europe, who wrote an obituary describing Hingst as a close friend who was unable to bear the media "shitstorm".

In response to coverage critical of him, Doerry argued that Scally's presentation of Hingst as in a "catastrophic psychological state" was unrepresentative of his interactions with her. Doerry described Hingst in his meetings with her as "confident, combative and determined", and drew attention to the fact he had given her the opportunity to answer "a detailed list" of questions about why she had made her claims. He also noted the eight-day period between the conversation that led to his original story and its publication, and stated that if she had recanted or apologised during that period, the article would not have been published "in the form it was". Doerry argued that his reports were morally necessary to avoid "provid[ing] Holocaust deniers with ammunition", and criticised commentators who implied the death of his grandmother Lilli Jahn in the Holocaust rendered him "oversensitive" regarding the subject matter.

=== Identity ===
The identity politics element of Hingst's claims has been the subject of discussion. Writing for Die Welt, Anne Waak compared Hingst to Rachel Dolezal, an activist who falsely claimed to be of African-American descent. Waak posited that both women's frauds were representative of an essentialist understanding of guilt and victimhood. By claiming to be members of marginalized groups, Hingst and Dolezal were able to present themselves as "authentic" experts on discrimination, and speak with a cultural cachet that under identity politics they would not have otherwise received. Ofrath too compared Hingst and Dolezal, referring to Hingst's narrative as "wrought with clichés and basic inconsistencies that suggest little genuine interest in the experience of being Jewish". By contrast, he referred to Dolezal as having a strong commitment to her black identity. From Ofrath's perspective, Hingst had little interest in or knowledge of Jewish life; he took offence at her claims most strongly because of her superficial understanding of European Jewry and lack of significant research into the subject.

Micha Brumlik, the former head of the Fritz Bauer Institute for the History and Impact of the Holocaust, juxtaposed Hingst's case with those of fraudsters contemporary with the Holocaust, who had claimed to themselves be survivors. He deemed that, unlike people who had been alive at the time, direct feelings of guilt and responsibility could not be a factor in her case; instead, she was attempting to escape a generational sense of historic responsibility. He referred to her as possessing "an unconscious will not only to identify with the victims, but to belong to them".

In the years following her outing and death, the identity politics element of Hingst's case kept her prominent in discussions of high-profile fraudsters. The concept of needing to be associated with the "victims" of ethnic discrimination and genocide, rather than the "perpetrators", was compared to cases such as those of Jessica Krug, H. G. Carrillo, Laurel Rose Willson, and Binjamin Wilkomirski. The latter gave name to the Wilkomirski syndrome, of which Hingst has been discussed as an example. Commentators referred to the sociocultural appeal of situations like Hingst's as being a desire to "unmask" a con artist and discover the underlying desire driving such claims. The nature of such cases has inspired discussion of the nature of identity itself and the degree to which fraud, obvious or subtle, plays a role in many politically oriented identities.

== See also ==
- Misha Defonseca, author of a fictitious Holocaust memoir
- Enric Marco, falsely claimed to be a Holocaust survivor
- Rosemarie Pence, falsely claimed to be a Holocaust survivor
- Donald J. Watt, author of a fictitious Holocaust memoir
