= EJO =

EJO may refer to:

- Ernest John Obiena
- European Journalism Observatory
- Koun Ejō (1198–1280), Sōtō Zen Buddhist patriarch
