= Anna Teresa Kavena =

German politician (born 1986)

Member of the Landtag of North Rhine-Westphalia
- Incumbent
- Assumed office 1 June 2022
- Preceded by: Andreas Becker
- Constituency: Recklinghausen I

Personal details
- Born: 2 March 1986 (age 40)
- Party: Social Democratic Party (since 2011)

Anna Teresa Kavena (born 2 March 1986) is a Polish-born German politician serving as a member of the Landtag of North Rhine-Westphalia since 2022. She has served as chairwoman of the Social Democratic Party in Recklinghausen since 2020.
