= Irrgang =

Irrgang is a surname. Notable people with the surname include:

- Annegret Irrgang, married Annegret Richter, (born 1950), German sprinter
- Detlef Irrgang (born 1966), German footballer
- Fritz Emil Irrgang (1890 1951), German politician and member of the Nazi Party
- Ewout Irrgang (born 1976), Dutch politician, anti-globalization activist and banking employee
- Pablo Irrgang (born 1972), Argentinian sculptor
