= Bartholomäus Sastrow =

German politician (1520–1603)

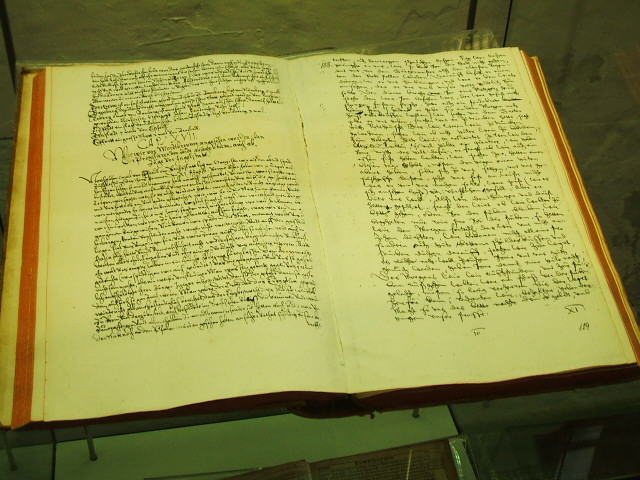
Bartholomäus Sastrow's autobiography on display in the Kulturhistorisches Museum in Stralsund

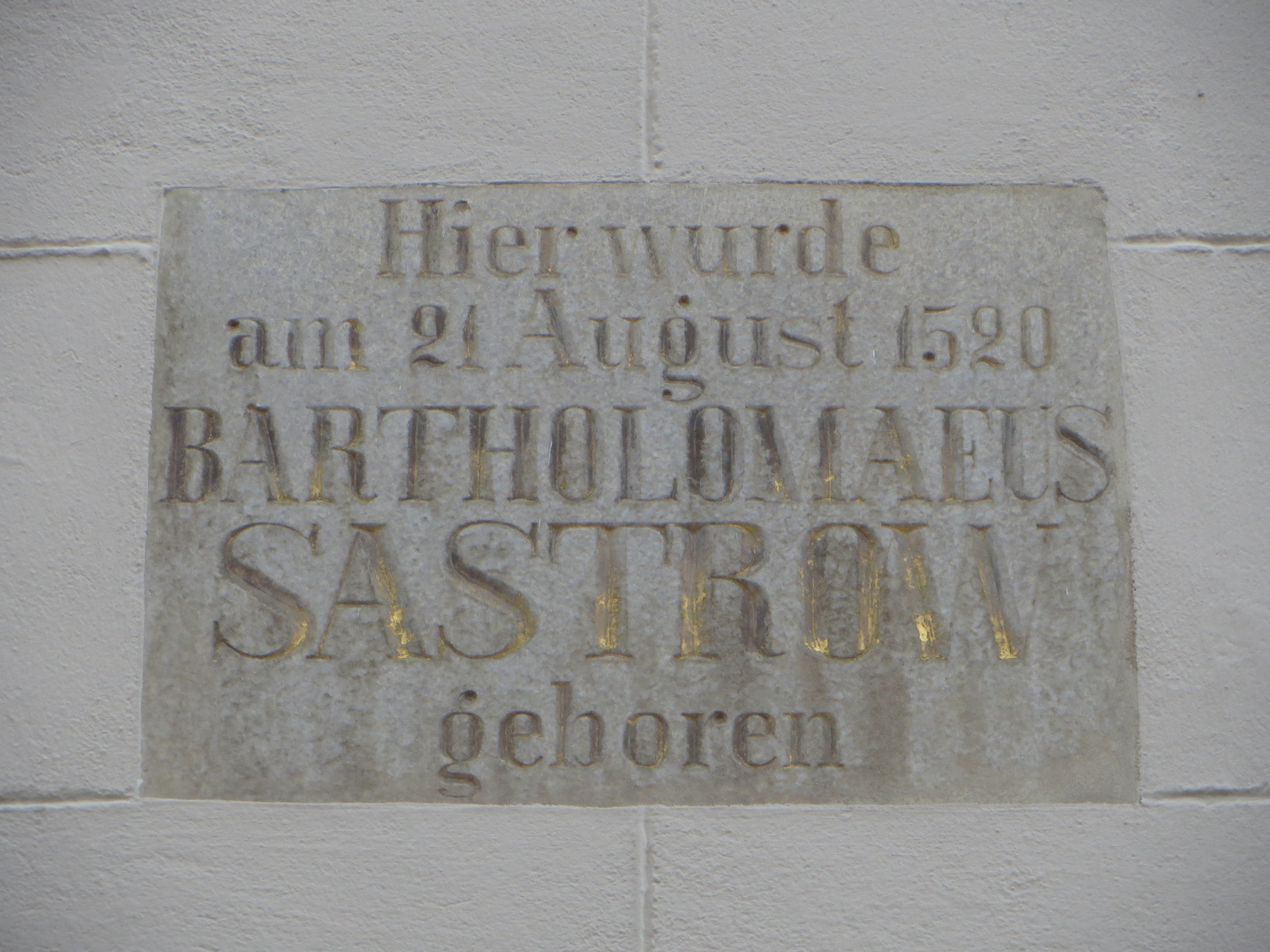
Plaque at Lange Straße 54 in Greifswald commemorating the birth of Bartholomäus Sastrow there

Bartholomäus Sastrow, sometimes anglicised Bartholomew (21 August 1520 – 7 February 1603), was a German official, notary, and mayor of Stralsund. He left a culturally and historically important autobiography, written in 1595 when he was 75 years of age. There is a plaque marking the site of his birth at Lange Straße 54 in Greifswald.

== Life ==
Bartholomäus Sastrow was born in Greifswald, the son of Nicolaus Sastrow (born 1488), a merchant, and his wife Anna Schmiterlow, who was a niece of Nikolaus Smiterlow, the mayor of Stralsund. His grandfather Hans Sastrow (murdered in 1494) had been a tenant farmer in Quilow before moving to Greifswald in 1487. Sastrow was the third of eight children; his four younger sisters and also his mother all died in an epidemic in 1549/50. He, his eldest sister Anna (1516–1594), the wife of Peter Frubose, Mayor of Greifswald, and their brother Karsten or Christian (1530–1580) were the only members of the family to have long lives. His elder brother Johannes became a lawyer, provost and poet, but died at 29 or 30 years of age.

His father Nicolaus was forced to flee Greifswald in about 1523 after killing a respected citizen during an argument. He settled in Stralsund; at roughly the same time, Nikolaus Smiterlow exiled himself voluntarily from Stralsund as a political protest and settled in his niece's house in Greifswald. His Protestant faith and inclination against turmoil and upheaval were lifelong examples to Sastrow. After Smiterlow's return to Stralsund in 1527, his niece, Sastrow's mother, also moved there with her children, rejoining her husband. Bartholomäus, however, remained in Greifswald with his grandfather until 1529. In 1533 Nicolaus Sastrow became Alderman of the Guild of Tailors. The Reformation had reached Stralsund in 1525, whereas Greifswald did not convert to Protestantism until 1531; the family must therefore have become Protestant when they moved, if not before.

In 1538 Sastrow entered the University of Rostock, where he studied for about a year; in 1541 he resumed his studies at the newly opened University of Greifswald, where he received a humanistic education including a thorough grounding in Greek and Latin. However, he was forced to leave without completing his studies because fresh disturbances in Stralsund caused by the Mayor of Lübeck, Jürgen Wullenwever, had led to his father and Smiterlow being placed under house arrest, causing financial problems for the family. In 1542, therefore, at their father's request, Bartholomäus and his brother Johannes rode to Speyer by way of Wittenberg, Leipzig and Frankfurt, partly to seek their fortunes and partly to speed up the court case on the now 20-year-old killing. They found the Imperial Chamber Court unstaffed. However, on the recommendation of Martin Luther and Philipp Melanchthon, Bartholomäus obtained a position as a clerk, and in 1544, despite never having completed his studies, he was awarded a diploma as a notary of the Holy Roman Empire. In 1545, despite being a Lutheran, he was appointed to the service of the Commander of the Knights of St. John in Nieder-Weisel, Christoph von Löwenstein.

His brother Johannes died in 1545 in the service of a cardinal in Italy, so Bartholomäus went to Italy the following year to wind up his affairs. In Rome he was affected by the heat and also was afraid of being discovered as a Protestant by the Inquisition. He therefore soon left Italy, despite having been offered a good position. He and a companion from Lübeck travelled as far as Innsbruck disguised as Italians and avoiding speaking German, for fear of attack by soldiers being sent by the Pope to aid the Holy Roman Emperor against the Schmalkaldic League; they then changed back to their normal clothes for fear of attack by German Protestants who did not recognise their strange accents.

On his return Sastrow worked in Wolgast for the Dukes of Pomerania, Philip I and Barnim XI, accompanied the Pomeranian representatives seeking reconciliation with Emperor Charles V, and took part in diplomatic missions to Bohemia, Saxony and the 1547/48 Diet of Augsburg (the geharnischter Reichstag). In 1548 he was appointed Pomeranian chargé at the Imperial Chamber Court in Speyer. Only then, with the court once more staffed after years of suspension, was he able to successfully pursue his father's case. While at Speyer he also went on several journeys, including visiting the cosmographer Sebastian Münster in Basel.

Dissatisfied with the court bureaucracy, in the early 1550s he decided to become independent, left the service of the dukes and in 1552 was enrolled as a notary of the Imperial Chamber Court. He returned first to Greifswald and then in 1555 to Stralsund. He supported the mayor, Nikolaus Gentzkow, in developing new regulations for schools and churches as well as the town law code. In 1562 he was elected to the city council, and in 1578 he became mayor, holding that position until his death in the city in 1603. His term was marked by a number of political and religious conflicts; Sastrow's unyielding style made him several enemies.

He married twice. By his sister-in-law Catharina Frubose, whom he married in 1551, he had three children, Katharina, Amnestia and Johannes (died 1593). A month after her death, in February 1598, he married her maid, Anna Haseneier.

== Autobiography ==
In 1595, at the age of 75, Sastrow wrote an autobiography. He made use of a variety of source materials: in addition to his own journaling and letters, official documents to which he had access as a notary and chronicles such as Johann Berckmann's Stralsund Chronicle and the biography of his predecessor as mayor, Franz Wessel. He modelled his use of these sources on Johannes Sleidanus' history, published in 1545–56. He may also have incorporated sections which he had composed earlier. He had the text written by a scribe; as a result, even the primary manuscript is not by his own hand, although handwriting evidence indicates that he added notes and corrections to the completed text.

He divided the work into four sections, the last of which, concerning his time in Stralsund, has not been preserved. It is unknown whether it was not completed or whether it was destroyed because of Sastrow's account of des Teuffels Battstube ("the Devil's bathhouse"), as he characterised his time there in the superscript. Speaking for the latter alternative is the fact that the account was not meant to be purely private, as can be seen from the almost complete absence of material about his family: thus, Sastrow says little more about his wife than that he married her, and does not even give the birth dates of his children, and he addresses it in the first instance to his sons-in-law Hinrich Godtschalk and Jakob Klerike, both city councillors.

Although it includes text from numerous Latin documents, the work is not written in Latin as is normal for contemporary humanistic writings, nor yet in Pomeranian Low German, which Johannes Bugenhagen had used in making his own translation of the Bible 50 years before, but in Early New High German Kanzleisprache, the language of depositions and records in the imperial and municipal courts.

The autobiography is an important contribution to 16th-century autobiographical prose. His is the first or only record of events such as the confrontation between Philip I, Landgrave of Hesse and the Emperor that led to Philip's imprisonment. The many incorporated legal documents are important sources for the history of the Empire, especially for the Geharnischter Reichstag of 1547/48 and the Augsburg Interim of 1548. However, there are major gaps in its coverage of contemporary history, since Sastrow, unlike Sleidanus, only recounts what he personally experienced.

The primary manuscript belongs to the City Archives of Stralsund and is on display in the Kulturhistorisches Museum Stralsund. Gottlieb Mohnike published a three-volume edition in 1823/24, which although insufficient by modern scientific standards remains the most complete edition.

=== Editions ===
- Bartholomäi Sastrowen Herkommen, Geburt und Lauff seines gantzen Lebens: auch was sich in dem Denckwerdiges zugetragen, so er mehrentheils selbst gesehen und gegenwärtig mit angehöret hat. Ed. Gottlieb Christian Friedrich Mohnike. 3 vols. Greifswald: Universitäts Buchhandlung. OCLC 9449036.
  - Volume 1, 1823
  - Volume 2, 1824
  - Volume 3, 1824
- Ein deutscher Bürger des sechzehnten Jahrhunderts: Selbstschilderung des Bartholomäus Sastrow. Ed. Horst Kohl. Voigtländers Quellenbücher 38. Leipzig: Voigtländer, 1912. OCLC 80052066. (Excerpt)
- Lauf meines Lebens: ein deutscher Bürger im 16. Jahrhundert. Ed. Christfried Coler. Spiegel deutscher Vergangenheit. Berlin: Rütten & Loening, 1956. OCLC 20766516.
- Denkwürdige Geschichten aus meinem Leben. Ed. Horst Langer. Schwerin: Thomas Helms, 2011. ISBN 978-3-940207-63-0 (Excerpt)
- Social Germany in Luther's Time. Being the Memoirs of Bartholomew Sastrow. Tr. Albert D. Vandam. Introduction Herbert A. L. Fisher. Westminster: Constable, 1902. OCLC 503712953. Repr. as Being the Memoirs of a German Burgomaster. London: Constable, 1905. OCLC 3460172. Online at Project Gutenberg.
