= Laurel Rose Willson =

American writer and con artist

- Born: August 18, 1941; Washington state
- Died: April 8, 2002 (aged 60)
- Other names: Lauren Stratford; Laura Grabowski
- Occupation: Author
- Known for: Discredited author of books about Satanic ritual abuse and Holocaust survival
- Spouse: Frank Austin (m. 1966; ann. 1966)

Laurel Rose Willson (August 18, 1941 – April 8, 2002) was an American author. She authored books as Lauren Stratford alleging Satanic ritual abuse (SRA), and later assumed the guise of a Holocaust survivor as Laura Grabowski. The general theme of her writing, from adolescence, was horror fiction, often violent and sexual, in which she was the victim.

== Early life ==
Willson was born in Tacoma, Washington, in 1941 to Marrian E. Disbrow. She was eventually adopted as an infant by Frank Cole Willson and his wife, schoolteacher Rose Gray Willson. She had one sister, five years older, named Willow Nell. A gifted musician from a young age, Willson learned to play the piano, clarinet, and flute. After college, Willson worked as a public-school music teacher. She later resided in Bakersfield, California, for a number of years, becoming known within evangelical Christian churches there as a vocalist and pianist.

She made allegations that she was psychologically and physically tortured from the age of four until her early twenties. In a book, she claimed that her adoptive mother allowed a laborer to rape her at six years old in lieu of paying for services, and by the age of eight she was supposedly forced into pornography and bestiality.

Willson's older sister, in a signed affidavit, noted:

My parents were devout Christians. They were both active members of the Bible Presbyterian Church in Tacoma. Both of them were fully committed to the Lord Jesus Christ. My sister and I were raised in a very sheltered, strict Christian home. There was no place in our home for anything remotely occult or pornographic. My mother continues as a dedicated Christian ...

== Satanic ritual abuse allegations ==
Under the name "Lauren Stratford", Willson wrote three books. The most infamous of them, Satan's Underground (1988), purported to tell a true story of her upbringing as a baby breeder (for sacrifices) in a satanic cult. Willson had also claimed to have firsthand knowledge of high-profile cases of alleged Satanic ritual abuse (including the child abuse cases in Kern County, where she resided), but her claims were dismissed by investigators as unreliable and fabricated. She befriended people connected to the high-profile Bakersfield and Manhattan Beach cases and incorporated SRA allegations into her own fabricated life story.

Willson, along with Michelle Smith (co-author of the inauthentic memoir Michelle Remembers), was featured on an episode of Oprah Winfrey's eponymous show in 1989, where Winfrey touted both stories as being unimpeachable fact.

In 1989, Willson published the Christian self-help book I Know You’re Hurting for victims of SRA, and in 1993 Stripped Naked, a fabricated trauma-and-recovery memoir in which she claimed that childhood abuse had caused her to develop Multiple Personality Disorder (MPD). As “Lauren Stratford,” she appeared both on Geraldo and The Oprah Winfrey Show in 1988, presenting herself as an MPD patient.

An investigation by Bob and Gretchen Passantino and Jon Trott in the Christian magazine Cornerstone discovered Stratford's real name and family background, and that her stories of abuse were false. In interviews with Willson's family and former associates, it was revealed that Willson had a long history of mental illness and making false allegations of abuse. She repeatedly threatened suicide and practiced self-mutilation and was reportedly hospitalized over forty times. She shaped her false identities around culturally influential victim narratives, and a former friend recalled that “most of the stories Laurel told me about her mom’s abuse were taken literally from Sybil.” Willson attracted the attention and sympathy of evangelical author Johanna Michaelsen, one of the most influential promoters of the Satanic moral panic of the period. While living with Michaelsen, Willson falsely claimed to have given birth to three children as a result of rape; two were allegedly killed in snuff films, and the third was supposedly sacrificed in her presence at a Satanic ritual.

Cornerstone found no evidence that she had ever been pregnant, and when initially posed questions to her publisher, were told that they had documentation to prove the claims. The authors eventually determined that the publisher had done nothing to verify the allegations. In February 1990, Harvest House Publishing "ceased publication" of Willson's books.

After her books were withdrawn from sale, Willson legally changed her name to Lauren Stratford.

She was also briefly involved in the McMartin preschool trial, claiming to have witnessed and stopped the abuses. She also claimed to have been involved in an ongoing lesbian relationship with Virginia McMartin.

== False identity as a Holocaust survivor ==
In 1999, Willson constructed another false identity as Laura Grabowski, using the surname of her Polish-Catholic maternal grandparents. Purporting to be a Jewish survivor of Auschwitz-Birkenau, Willson as Grabowski collected thousands of dollars in donations intended for Holocaust survivors. Willson assumed the identity of an orphan who was sent to an orphanage in Kraków after Auschwitz and was adopted in America in the mid-1950s. She claimed to be a victim of the infamous Nazi doctor Josef Mengele, alleging experiments had rendered her infertile and the chemical injections blinded her eyes irrevocably. When pressed for specifics regarding her time at the camps, she was unable to provide dates, times or names.

Willson made a claim with the Swiss Fund for victim compensation for Holocaust survivors, using her assumed identity but with the Social Security Number of her true identity, Willson. Willson befriended Binjamin Wilkomirski, claiming to remember him from the camps, even going so far as to go on lecture engagements together to recount their story. Wilkomirski (real name Bruno Grosjean) later was revealed to be neither Jewish nor a Holocaust survivor, aiding in the exposure of Willson as a fraud.

Cornerstone once again published an exposé of Laurel's real identity.

== See also ==
- Misery literature
- Wilkomirski syndrome
- Robert Passantino
- Marie Sophie Hingst
