= Wilkomirski syndrome =

Non-Jews presenting as Jewish Holocaust survivors

Wilkomirski syndrome (German: Wilkomirski-Syndrom) is a public phenomenon when non-Jews present themselves as Jewish Holocaust survivors or Jews with a Holocaust trauma in the family. It is considered fraudulent and is particularly common as a form of literary fraud in the Holocaust memoir circuit. The term is a reference to the Munchausen syndrome and is named after Binjamin Wilkomirski, the pseudonym used by the author of Fragments: Memories of a Wartime Childhood (1995), a false memoir which initially received positive publicity and several awards. The 1998 revelation that the book was based on fabrications initiated public discussions in Germany, and in 2001 the Moses Mendelssohn Center for European Jewish Studies hosted a conference on "Das Wilkomirski-Syndrom".

Daniel Ganzfried, the journalist who broke the story about Wilkomirski, argues that the case should be seen as a product of a larger industry of Holocaust-related material and academic Holocaust studies, where economic incentives lead to the creation of material of little or no value. In addition to concern over the fraud acts themselves, many cases of false Holocaust stories are also criticized for enabling Holocaust denier claims as to the supposed falsification of the wider events of the genocide. Later cases that have been discussed in Germany as examples of the Wilkomirski syndrome include Fabian Wolff, Wolfgang Seibert, Peter Loth, and Marie Sophie Hingst.

== Cases ==
=== Authors ===
- Marie Sophie Hingst
- Misha Defonseca
- Rosemarie Koczy
- Rosemarie Pence
- Laurel Rose Willson

=== Other public figures ===
- George Santos, falsely claimed his grandparents were Jewish Holocaust refugees
- Enric Marco, former member of Amical de Mauthausen
- Peter Loth (born 1943), a co-plaintiff in the trial against a former Stutthof concentration camp guard, claimed to have been born in the camp and subjected to medical experiments as a child.

=== Works ===
- Fragments: Memories of a Wartime Childhood (1995)
- Misha: A Mémoire of the Holocaust Years (1997)
- Hannah: From Dachau to the Olympics and Beyond (2005)
- Angel at the Fence (2009)
- The Man Who Broke into Auschwitz (2011)

== In media ==
In the 2007 film The Memory Thief, a young man grows obsessed with the Holocaust and begins to believe that he is a Holocaust survivor.
