= Albert Dresden Vandam =

English journalist and writer (1843–1903)

Albert Dresden Vandam (1843–1903) was an English journalist and writer.

== Life ==
Born in London in March 1843, the son of Mark Vandam, his background was Dutch-Jewish descent. Before he was 13 he was sent to Paris, where he was privately educated, and stayed 15 years. According to his own account, his youth was passed among prominent French people and that he, at the same time, made the acquaintance of the theatrical and Bohemian worlds of the French capital.

Vandam began a career as a journalist during the Prusso-Austrian War of 1866, writing for English papers, and he was correspondent for American papers during the Franco-Prussian War of 1870-71. Settling in London in 1871, he engaged in translation from the French and Dutch and other literary work, occasionally going abroad on special missions for newspapers. From 1882 to 1887 Vandam was again in Paris as correspondent for the Globe, subsequently making his home anew in London.

Vandam died in London on 25 October 1903.

== Works ==
Vandam's An Englishman in Paris, published anonymously in 1892 (2 vols.), collected gossip of the courts of Louis Philippe and the Second Empire. He wrote further works on French life and history, sometimes slighting:

- My Paris Note-Book (1894);
- French Men and French Manners (1895);
- Undercurrents of the Second Empire (1897); and
- Men and Manners of the Second Empire (1904).

Vandam translated for the first time into English, under the title of Social Germany in Luther's Time, the autobiography of the sixteenth-century Pomeranian notary Bartholomäus Sastrow, which he published in 1902 (with introduction by H. A. L. Fisher). Other works included:

- L'Amours of Great Men (2 vols.), 1878.
- We Two at Monte Carlo, 1890, a novel.
- Masterpieces of Crime, 1892.
- The Mystery of the Patrician Club, 1894.
- A Court Tragedy, 1900.

== Family ==
Vandam married Maria, daughter of Lewin Moseley, a London dentist.

== Notes ==
Attribution

This article incorporates text from a publication now in the public domain: Lee, Sidney, ed. (1912). "Vandam, Albert Dresden". Dictionary of National Biography (2nd supplement). Vol. 3. London: Smith, Elder & Co.
