= Rosemarie Koczy =

Artist, and author of a fraudulent Holocaust memoir

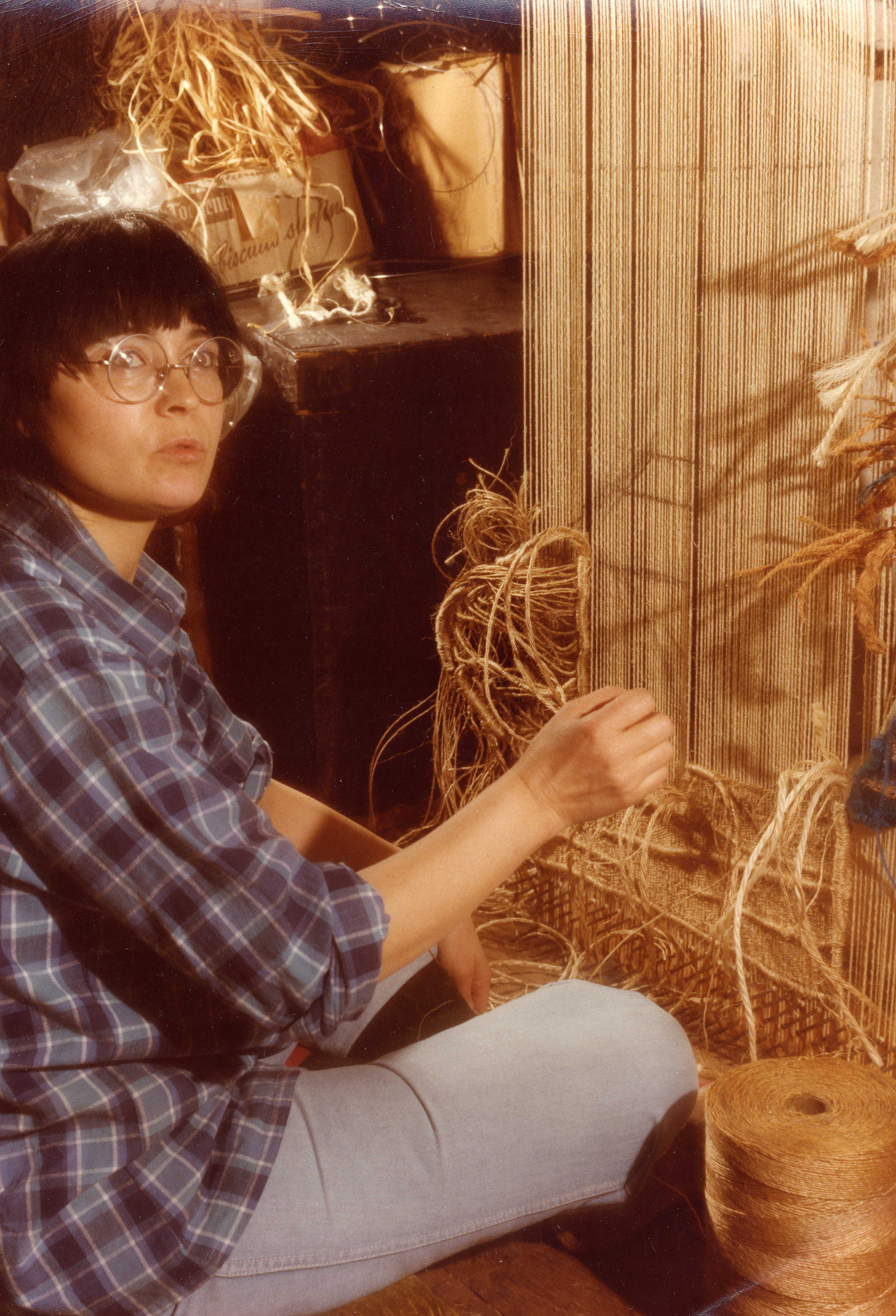
Rosemarie Koczy working on tapestry, 1978

Rosemarie Inge Koczy (March 5, 1939 – December 12, 2007) was an artist and teacher known for her many works dealing with the Holocaust.

== Life ==
Koczy was born March 5, 1939, in Recklinghausen, Germany, the eldest daughter of Martha Wusthoff and Karl Koczy. According to her memoir, she and her parents were persecuted by the Nazis for their Jewish ancestry. Fifty years after the war's end, she described being deported in 1942 at the age of 3, surviving two concentration camps, first at Traunstein (Dachau) and then at Ottenhausen (Struthof), writing of that time:

We worked in the fields every day. I saw the killings, the shavings, the bleachings, the torture and hunger, the cold, typhus, tuberculosis. Death was all around!

In November 2017, during an exhibition of her works in Recklinghausen, local historians and archivists who looked for local documents to corroborate her biography came to the conclusion that her Holocaust memoir had been forged. They assert that neither she nor her parents were of Jewish ancestry, that they were not persecuted during the Holocaust, and that Koczy was never in a concentration camp. Koczy's widowed husband rejected these claims. Yad Vashem announced that it would examine Koczy's biography but keep her artworks as a relevant response to the Holocaust regardless of their findings.

Remaining at Ottenhausen for several years after its liberation in 1945, she was raised afterwards by her maternal grandparents, her mother briefly and several foster families and orphanages.

In 1959 Koczy left Germany for Geneva, Switzerland. She was accepted into the Ecole des Arts Decoratifs in 1961, where she received her diploma with distinction four years later.

Koczy's first marriage (which brought her Swiss citizenship) ended in divorce. She married composer Louis Pelosi, whom she had met at the MacDowell Colony, in 1984. She became an American citizen in 1989.

Koczy created a community art school outside of Geneva in the 1970s and in Croton-on-Hudson, New York, where she taught privately over the last twenty years of her life. After 1995 she gave free lessons to elderly and disabled residents of Maple House in Ossining, where she supplied materials, arranged shows and acquisitions (many by her and her husband). The couple also hosted annual art and music gatherings in their home for many years.

She died December 12, 2007, in Croton-on-Hudson, New York.

Her three-volume memoir titled I Weave You a Shroud was published 2009-2013.

== Art ==
Concentrating upon tapestry, she mounted two solo museum exhibitions in Geneva (1970 and 1979); she produced more than seventy fiber works in fifteen years. During this time she also met Peggy Guggenheim, who commissioned a tapestry from her and introduced her to Thomas Messer, then-curator of the Guggenheim Museum.

In the mid 1970s she began her works dealing with the Holocaust. In 1980, Koczy accepted the first of two fellowships to the MacDowell (artists' residency and workshop) organisation and started creating pen-and-ink drawings memorializing Holocaust victims. She had created more than 12,000 of these drawings before her death. In her later years Koczy insisted they be shown only accompanied by a statement in English, French, and German which begins:

"The drawings I make every day are titled 'I Weave You A Shroud.' They are burials I offer to those I saw die in the camps."

She also completed hundreds of paintings, wood sculptures, and other works on the subject.

She was the first female recipient of the Francis Greenburger Award, chosen and presented by Thomas Messer at the Guggenheim in 1986.

Koczy's work is housed in institutions such as the Guggenheim (both in New York and Venice), the Illinois Holocaust Museum and Education Center, the Milwaukee Art Museum, the Kupferberg Holocaust Resource Center and Art Gallery/Museum, the Collection de l'art brut in Lausanne (where in 1985 she inaugurated Jean Dubuffet's Neuve Invention Annex), Museum im Lagerhaus in St. Gallen, Museum Charlotte Zander in Bonnigheim (Germany), Galerie Miyawaki in Kyoto (Japan), Kunsthalle Recklinghausen, the Gedenkstatte Buchenwald, Musée de la Création Franche in Begles (France), Museum Dr. Guislain in Gent Belgium and Yad Vashem, the Israeli Holocaust Memorial Museum in Jerusalem (which in 2007 accepted her largest sculpture, Deportation of the Children, into its permanent collection). An exhibition of over 100 of her works ran at the City University of New York - Queensborough Community College Art Gallery in 2013-2014, accompanied by a monograph dedicated to her work.

Of her art, Goya scholar Fred Licht has written:

Koczy's drawings have a moral aspect ... One receives the impression that she feels it her duty to execute (them), and duty cannot exist without a sense of moral responsibility.

Outsider art critic Roger Cardinal recalled:

I once saw a wall display of several dozen of these images ... The combination of ceaseless proliferation and searing emotion made an impact that struck to the very core of human feeling.

Thomas Messer wrote:

Koczy's art, in the last analysis, speaks to us through formal authority and through convincing resolution, leaving us thereby in a state of catharsis, uplifted and hopeful.

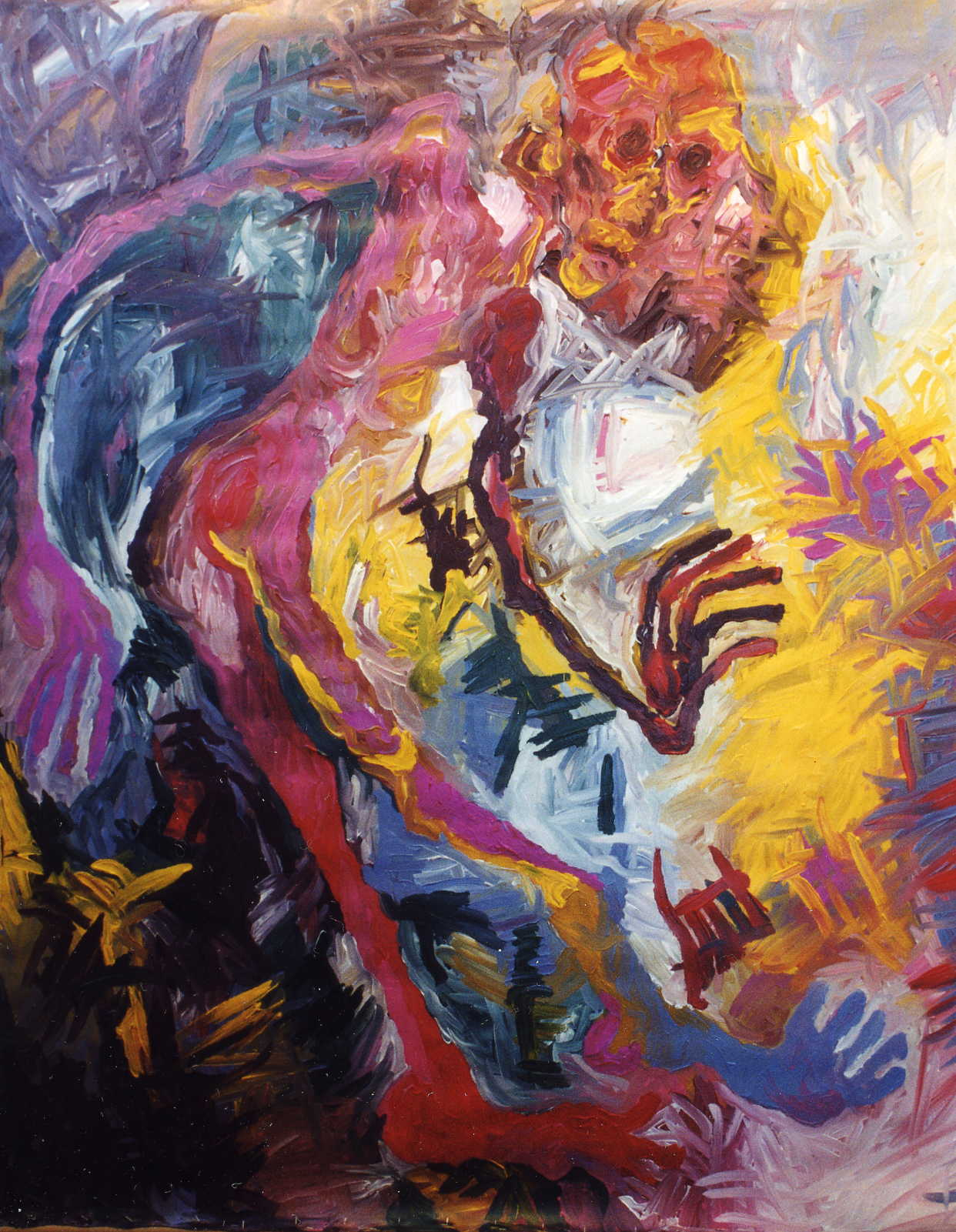
Painting No. 156, "Untitled", Rosemarie Koczy, 1977

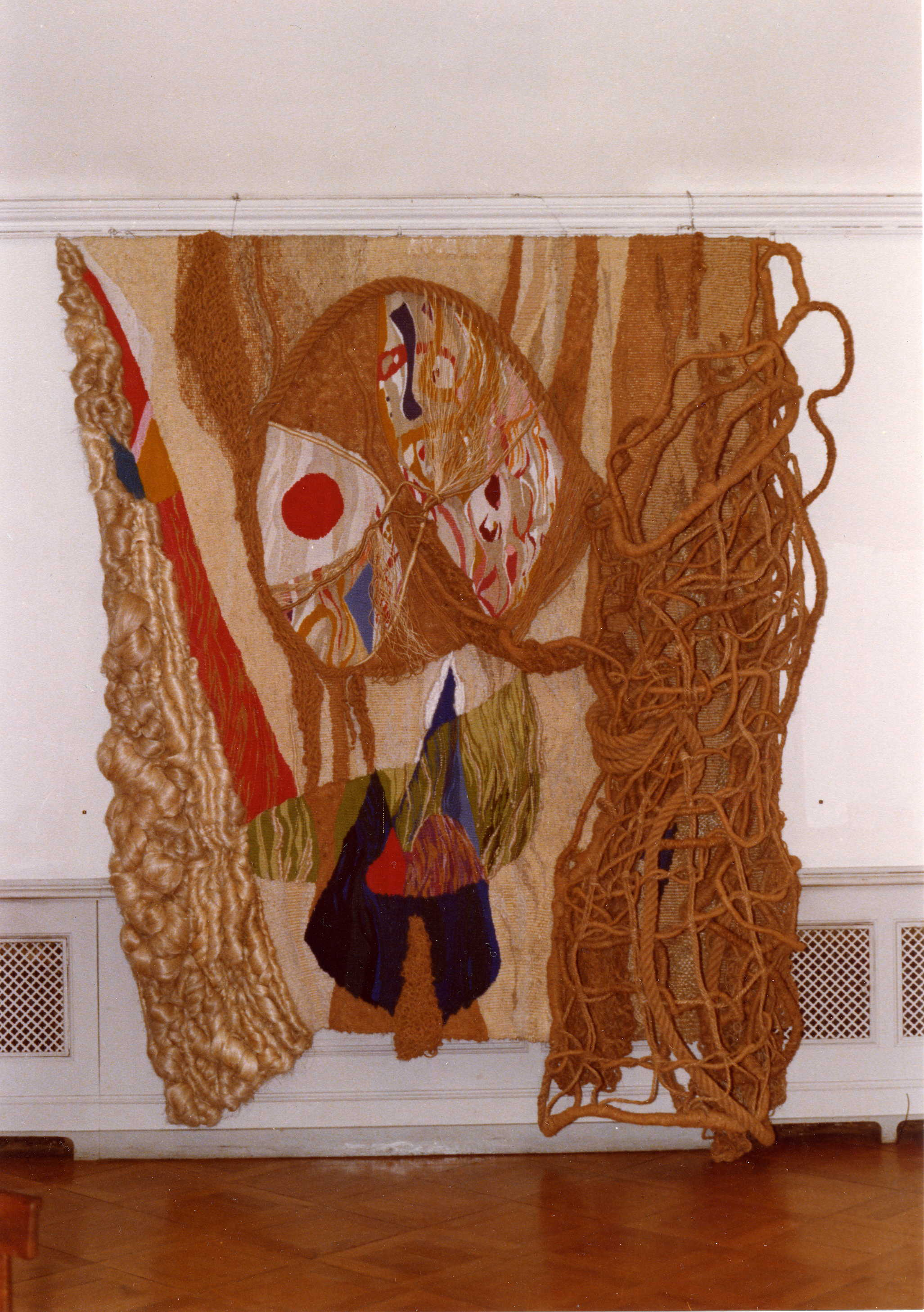
Tapestry, "Torah", Rosemarie Koczy, 1977

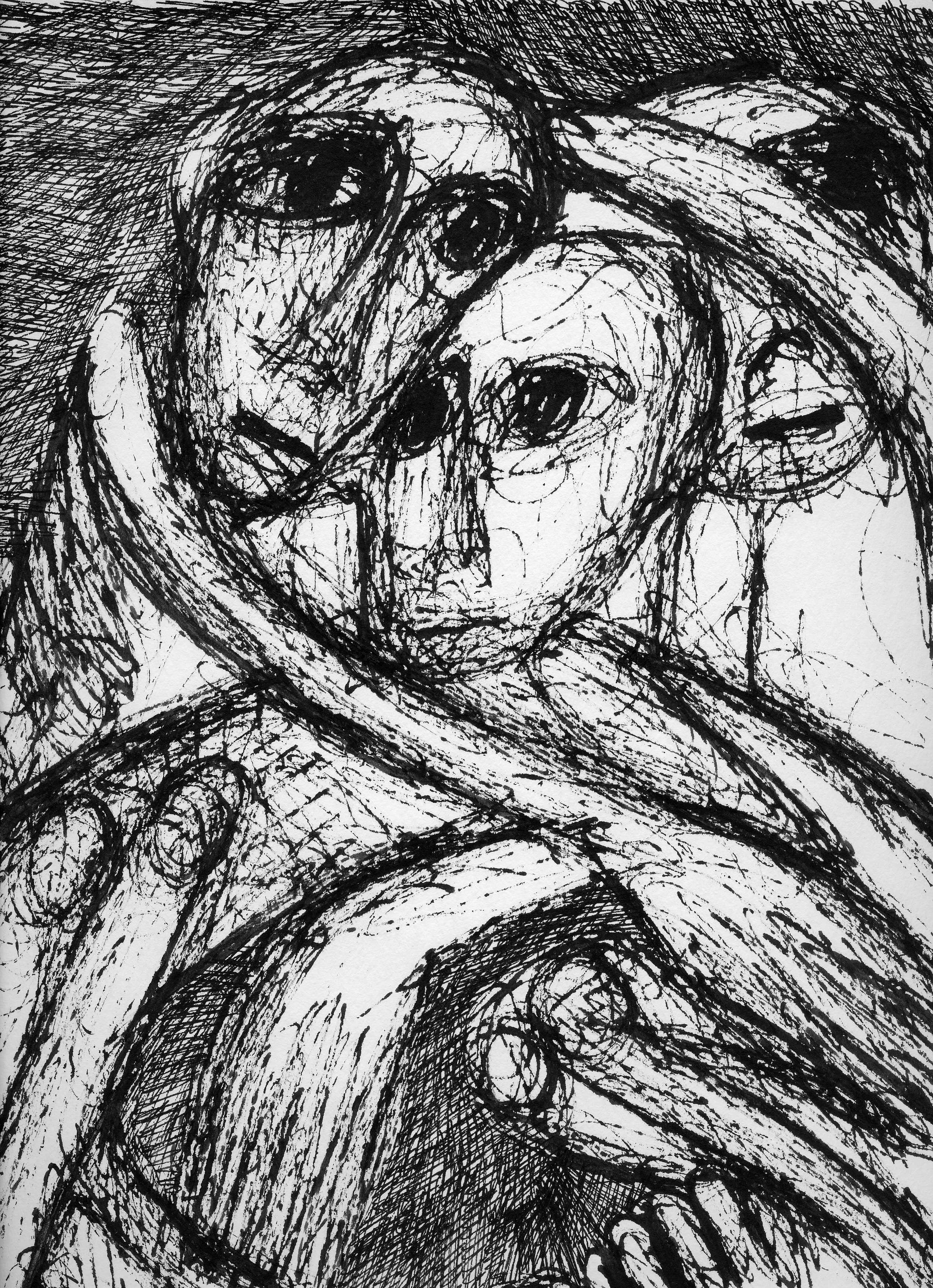
Detail of Drawing No. 48, Book 82, Rosemarie Koczy, 1997

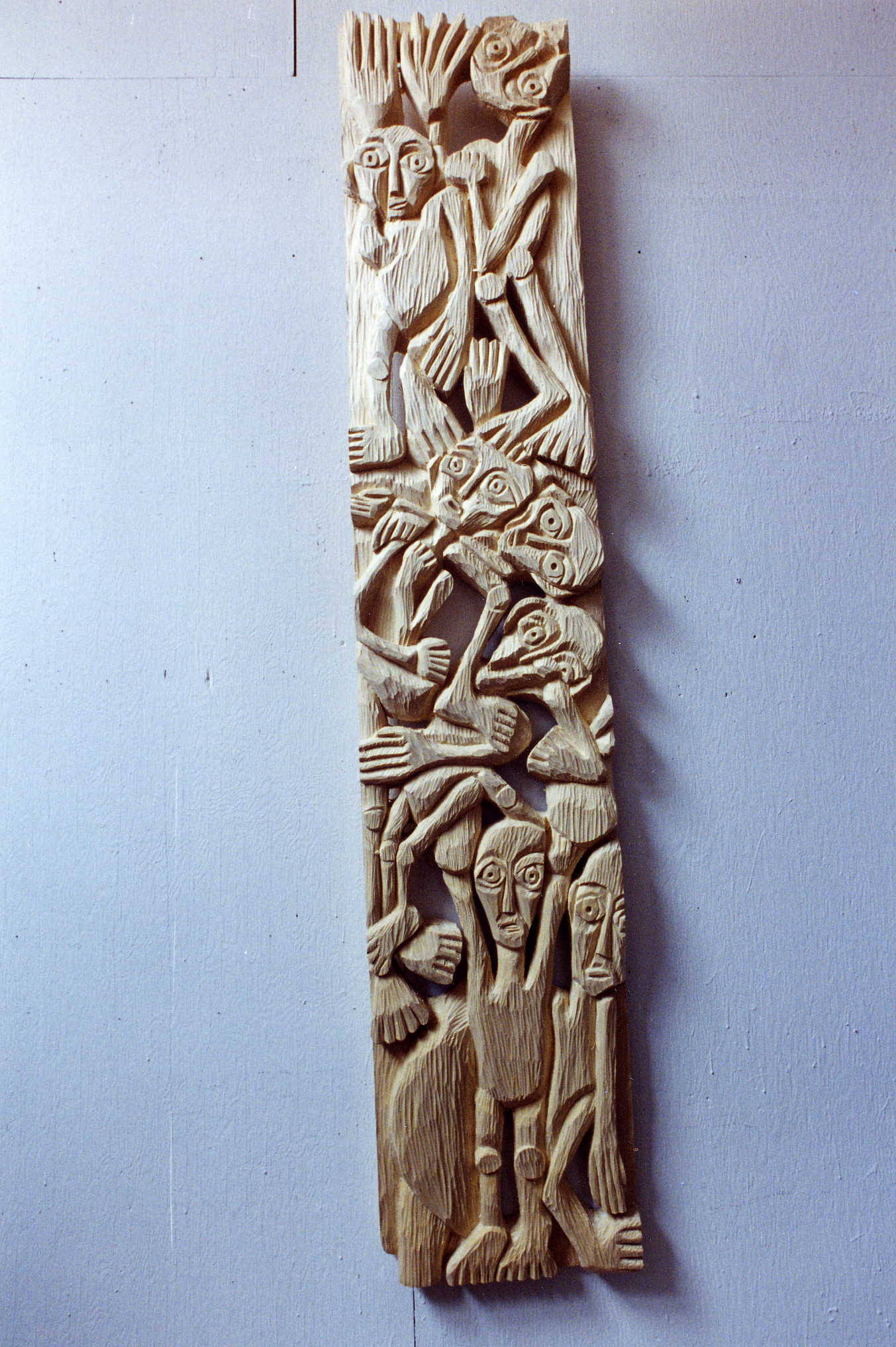
Wood sculpture No. 107, "Deportation Train", Rosemarie Koczy, 2002

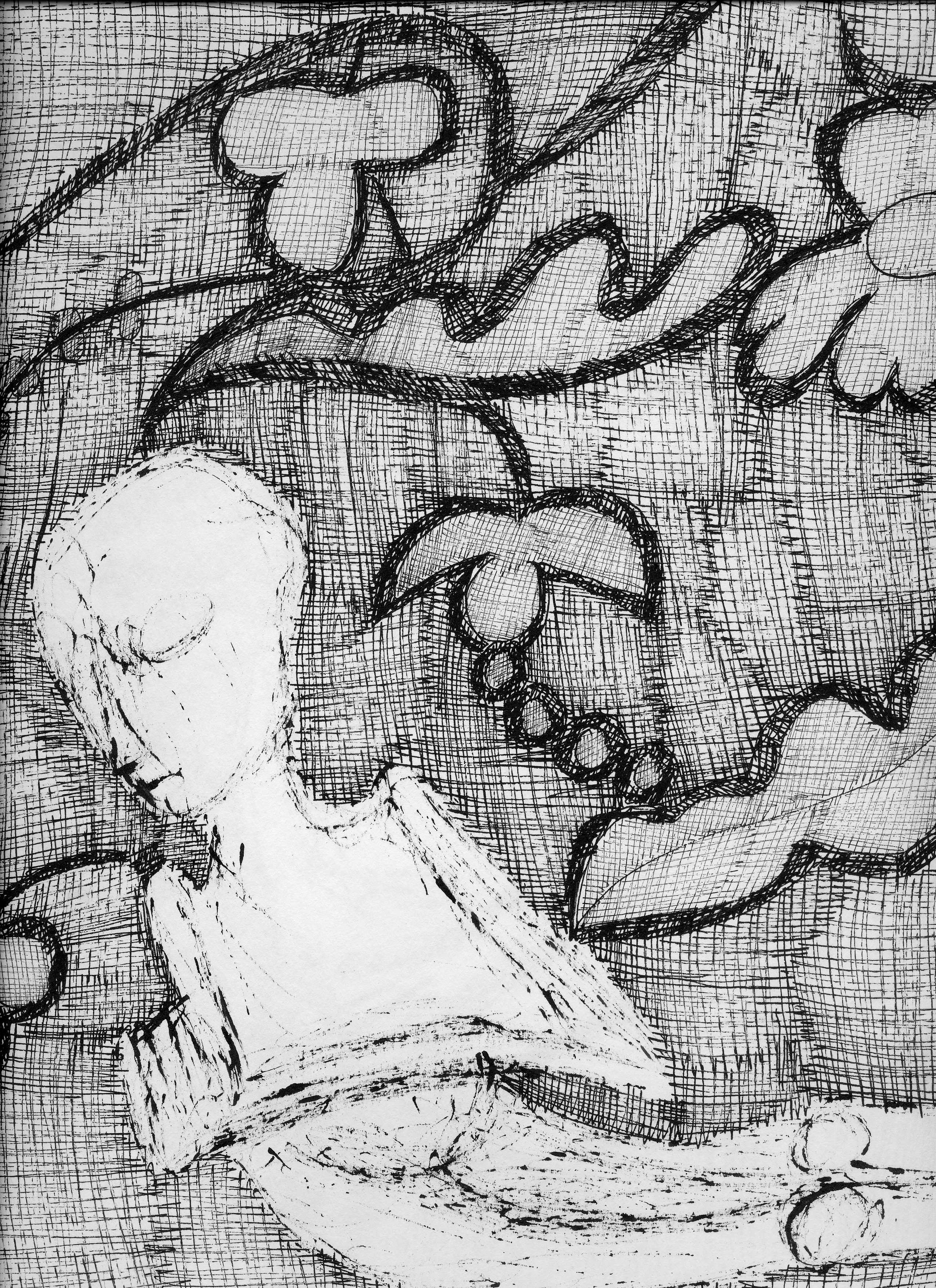
Detail of Drawing No. 48, Book 193, Rosemarie Koczy, 2007

== See also ==
- Wilkomirski syndrome
