= Fritz Emil Irrgang =

German politician

Fritz Emil Irrgang (10m May 1890 – 16 December 1951) was a German politician, and a member of the Nazi Party and the Sturmabteilung (SA).

Irrgang was born in Linderode in the Province of Brandenburg (today, Lipinki Łużyckie in Poland). He attended Volksschule followed by trade school in Sorau (today, Żary), and an apprenticeship as a dental technician from 1906 to 1909. He worked as a dental technician in Forst, Königsberg, and Tilsit (today, Sovetsk, Kaliningrad Oblast) between 1909 and 1911, moving to Bielefeld in 1911 and opening his own dental laboratory there in 1914. He fought in the First World War between 1914 and 1918.

Irrgang was a member of the German People's Party (DVP) in 1923. On 10 May 1924, he Joined the Völkisch-Social Bloc. Between 1924 and 1930, Irrgang was politically active in Bielefeld as a city councilor, alderman, and chairman of the city council. He joined the Nazi Party in 1929 (membership number 150,690). He joined the SA at the same time, an organisation in which he subsequently attained the rank of SA-Standartenführer.

On 5 March 1933, just 5 weeks after the Nazi seizure of power, he was elected to the Reichstag as a member for electoral constituency 17 (Westphalia North) and he served as a member of that body until the collapse of Nazism in 1945. He also was made a member of the provincial parliament of the Province of Westphalia and served on the provincial committee from 1937 to 1945. He was the Oberbürgermeister of a number of German towns during the Nazi period, including Bottrop from August 1933, then Bocholt in January 1935 and, finally, Recklinghausen from 1939 to 1945.

Following the Second World War, Irrgang joined the Free Democratic Party and served as the chairman of a local government committee for that party. He died in Northeim in 1951.
