= Henry Albert Boedeker =

Henry Albert Boedeker (2 January 1872 – 22 June 1940) was a physician and one of the first settlers in British East Africa and a significant figure in the region's early colonial medical history,

Boedeker was born on 2 January 1872 in Moulmein, Burma (now Myanmar), to Frederick W. Boedeker, a timber manager for a Scottish company. His mother's name remains unclear, although records indicate he had a mixed-race Parsi and European background and speculated Burmese roots. Errol Trzebinski has asserted that Dr, Bodeker was 'a Parsee by religion'.

Boedeker pursued medical studies at the University of Glasgow and furthered his education in Germany, graduating with a medical degree in 1894.

He married Helen Wardlaw, daughter of Sir Henry Wardlaw of Pitreavie, 18th Baronet. Their relationship was deemed scandalous by society at the time, due to his racial origins and her aristocratic status. In search of a new life far from the racial prejudice they faced in Britain, Boedeker and his wife were inspired by an article extolling the virtues of Kikuyu country as a “land flowing with milk and honey” that appeared in a British newspaper.

Boedeker's motivation to farm in the highlands was partly driven by a desire to escape the stigma of being “coloured,” as he sought to create a new identity in British East Africa, where race relations, though still hierarchical, offered him more personal freedom than in Britain.
