= Erich Bödeker =

German sculptor

Erich Bödeker (April 11, 1904 – February 21, 1971) was a German sculptor.

== Life ==
After attending elementary school, Bödeker worked as a miner for 41 years, 35 of which were spent underground. Alongside his main job, he also worked part-time as a farmer and butcher. In 1959, an illness with silicosis forced him to give up his job in mining. He then began to create self-taught figures out of wood and concrete, which he painted with bright colors. The motifs depicted included people and animals, including acquaintances, politicians, artists and fantasy figures.

Bödeker's first works were created from everyday and waste materials such as tin cans, kitchen utensils and disused machine parts. He later concentrated on figurative sculptures made of wood and concrete. His works are characterized by a stylized design reduced to basic forms. The use of color is bold and unmodulated, without internal detailing. Bödeker's garden often served as an exhibition space for over a hundred of these colorful figures, which depicted a wide variety of motifs - from miners, police officers and athletes to church dignitaries and animals from different regions of the world.

In 1963, Thomas Grochowiak, then director of the museums in Recklinghausen and Oberhausen, arranged Bödeker's first public exhibition in Recklinghausen.

Over the years, Bödeker's works found their way into numerous international museums, became part of private and institutional collections and achieved remarkable auction prices.

Bödeker's works can be found in the collection of the Clemens Sels Museum in Neuss and in the Zander Collection in Cologne, among others.

== Other information ==
In honor of the artist, the Erich Bödeker Society for Naive Art (Erich Bödeker-Gesellschaft für naive Kunst e.V.) was founded in 1982 in Hanover. The society not only documents Bödeker’s work but also promotes the recognition of so-called 'Naive Art' in general.

Erich Bödeker was a direct neighbor of Hape Kerkeling in his hometown of Bockholt. Kerkeling mentions him in his childhood memoir "Der Junge muss an die frische Luft" ("The Boy Needs Fresh Air").

== Exhibitions (selection) ==
- 1963: Recklinghausen, Ruhrfestspiele
- 1964: Darmstadt, Mathildenhöhe
- 1965: Hamburg, Galerie Brockstedt
- 1967: Bonn, Municipal Art Collections
- 1968: Zurich, Galerie Bischofberger
- 1969: Essen, Museum Folkwang
- 1970: Oberhausen, Municipal Gallery
- 1971: Zagreb, Gallery of Primitive Art
- 1972: Humlebæk, Louisiana Museum of Modern Art
- 1973: Oslo, Henie Onstad Kunstsenter
- 1974: Munich, Haus der Kunst
- 1975: Kunsthaus Zürich
- 1976: Düsseldorf, Galerie Zimmer
- 1981: Stuttgart, Württembergischer Kunstverein
- 1982: Paris, Goethe-Institut
- 1983: Zagreb, Gallery of Primitive Art
- 1985: Siegburg, Wasserwerk. Galerie Lange
- 1986: Reinbek, Museum Rade
- 1987: Hanover, Sprengel Museum
- 1988: Hamburg, Altona Museum
- 1989: Düsseldorf, Galerie Zimmer
- 1990: Munich, Galerie Charlotte
- 1996: Bönnigheim, Museum Charlotte Zander
- 2000: Oberhausen, Ludwig Galerie
- 2001: Venice Biennale
- 2002: Cologne ArtCologne (Wasserwerk.Galerie Lange)
- 2016: Bönnigheim, Zander Collection
- 2017: Clemens Sels Museum Neuss

== Bibliography ==
- Susanne Zander, ed. (2023), 26 Artists. Works from the Zander Collection., Cologne: Verlag der Buchhandlung Walther und Franz König.
- Tilman Osterwold, ed. (1988), Erich Bödeker, Exhibition Catalog, Stuttgart: Württembergischer Kunstverein.
