= Recklinghausen =

Recklinghausen Riäkelhusen (Westphalian)
- City
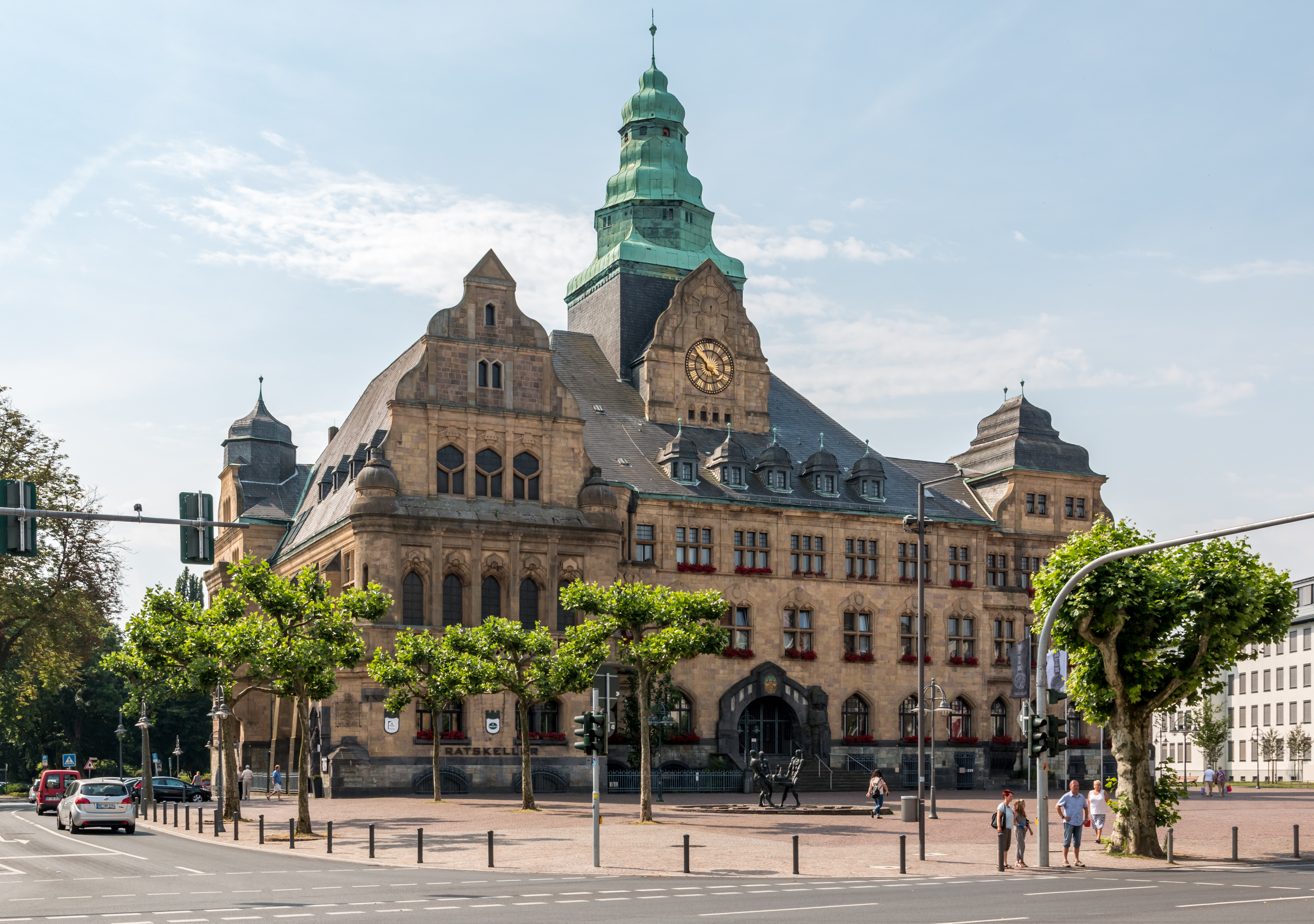
- City hall

- Flag Coat of arms

- Location of Recklinghausen within Recklinghausen district
- Interactive map of Recklinghausen
- Location within Germany Location within North Rhine-Westphalia
- Coordinates: 51°35′6″N 7°9′43″E
- Country: Germany
- State: North Rhine-Westphalia
- Admin. region: Münster
- District: Recklinghausen

Government
  - Mayor (2025–30): Axel Tschersich (SPD)

Area
  - Total: 66.5 km^{2} (25.7 sq mi)
- Elevation: 85 m (279 ft)

Population (2025-12-31)
  - Total: 114,851
  - Density: 1,730/km^{2} (4,470/sq mi)
- Time zone: UTC+01:00 (CET)
  - Summer (DST): UTC+02:00 (CEST)
- Postal codes: 45601–45665
- Dialling codes: 02361
- Vehicle registration: RE, CAS, GLA
- Website: www.recklinghausen.de (in German)

Recklinghausen (German: [ˌʁɛklɪŋˈhaʊzn̩]; Westphalian: Riäkelhusen) is the northernmost city in the Ruhr-Area and the capital of the Recklinghausen district. It borders the rural Münsterland and is characterized by large fields and farms in the north and industry in the south. Recklinghausen is the 60th-largest city in Germany and the 22nd-largest city in North Rhine-Westphalia.

== History ==
First mentioned in 1017 as Ricoldinchuson, in 1150 the city was the center of the surrounding Vest Recklinghausen. In 1236, Recklinghausen received town privileges. There is record of Jews in the city as early as 1305. As part of the County of Vest, ownership of Recklinghausen changed several times in the 15th and 16th century, and in 1576, the entire county was pawned to the Elector of Cologne. In 1582–83, again in 1586, and again in 1587, the city was plundered by partisan armies during the Cologne War, a feud over religious parity in Electorate of Cologne and electoral influence in the Holy Roman Empire.

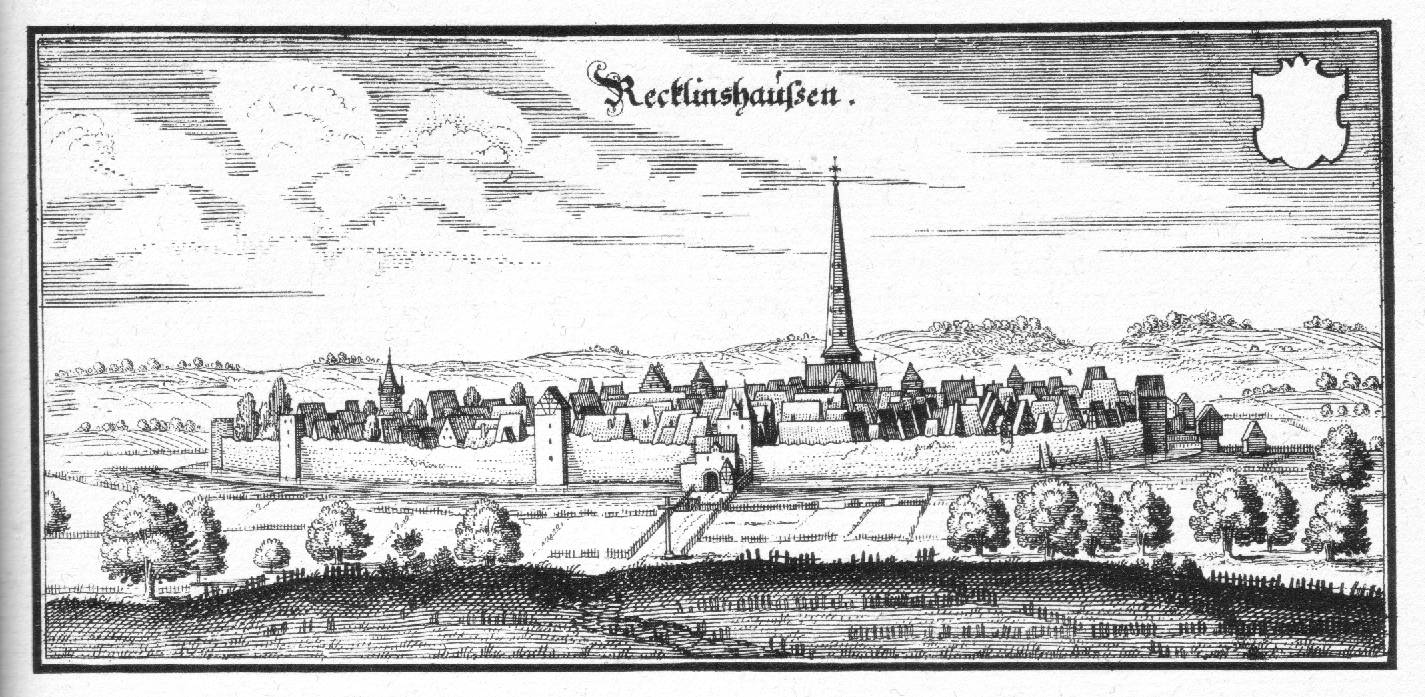
Seventeenth-century Recklinghausen

Recklinghausen was also the site of more than 100 witchcraft trials (1514–1710). The trial activity reached a climax twice: In the time period of 1580/81 and again in 1588/89. The last person to be convicted of witchcraft was Anna Spickermann; after spending 16 months in prison, she was sentenced to death by sword and burned afterward.

c. 1600, the administration of the Vest Recklinghausen was divided into two parts, with the eastern part administered by Recklinghausen. The town of Recklinghausen including the parish of Recklinghausen and the parishes Ahsen, Datteln, Flaesheim, Hamm-Bossendorf, Henrichenburg, Herten, Horneburg, Oer, Suderwich, Waltrop and Westerholt. In 1803-1811 became the capital of a sovereign Principality of the Dukes of Arenberg who retain the title. c. 1815, the Vest was made a Bürgermeisterei, with the town becoming the seat. In 1819, Herten joined the Recklinghausen Bürgermeisterei, and Erkenschwick followed in 1821.

During World War II, in December 1939, the Stalag XX-B prisoner-of-war camp was founded in the city, however, it was relocated after a few days, and from 1941 to 1943, a forced labour camp was operated in the city. As a target of the Oil Campaign of World War II, oil production at Recklinghausen/Forstezung was bombed by the RAF on 15 January 1945; and South Recklinghausen (Recklinghausen Süd) was captured by the US 137th Infantry on 1 April 1945.

== Population ==
Historical population

Year	Pop.	±% p.a.
1965	128,004	—
1970	125,369	−0.42%
1975	122,447	−0.47%
1980	119,425	−0.50%
1985	117,900	−0.26%
1990	125,060	+1.19%
1995	127,216	+0.34%

Year	Pop.	±% p.a.
2000	124,785	−0.39%
2005	121,827	−0.48%
2010	118,365	−0.57%
2015	114,330	−0.69%
2020	110,705	−0.64%
2025	114,851	+0.74%

Source: Landesdatabank Nordrhein-Westfalen

== Main sights ==
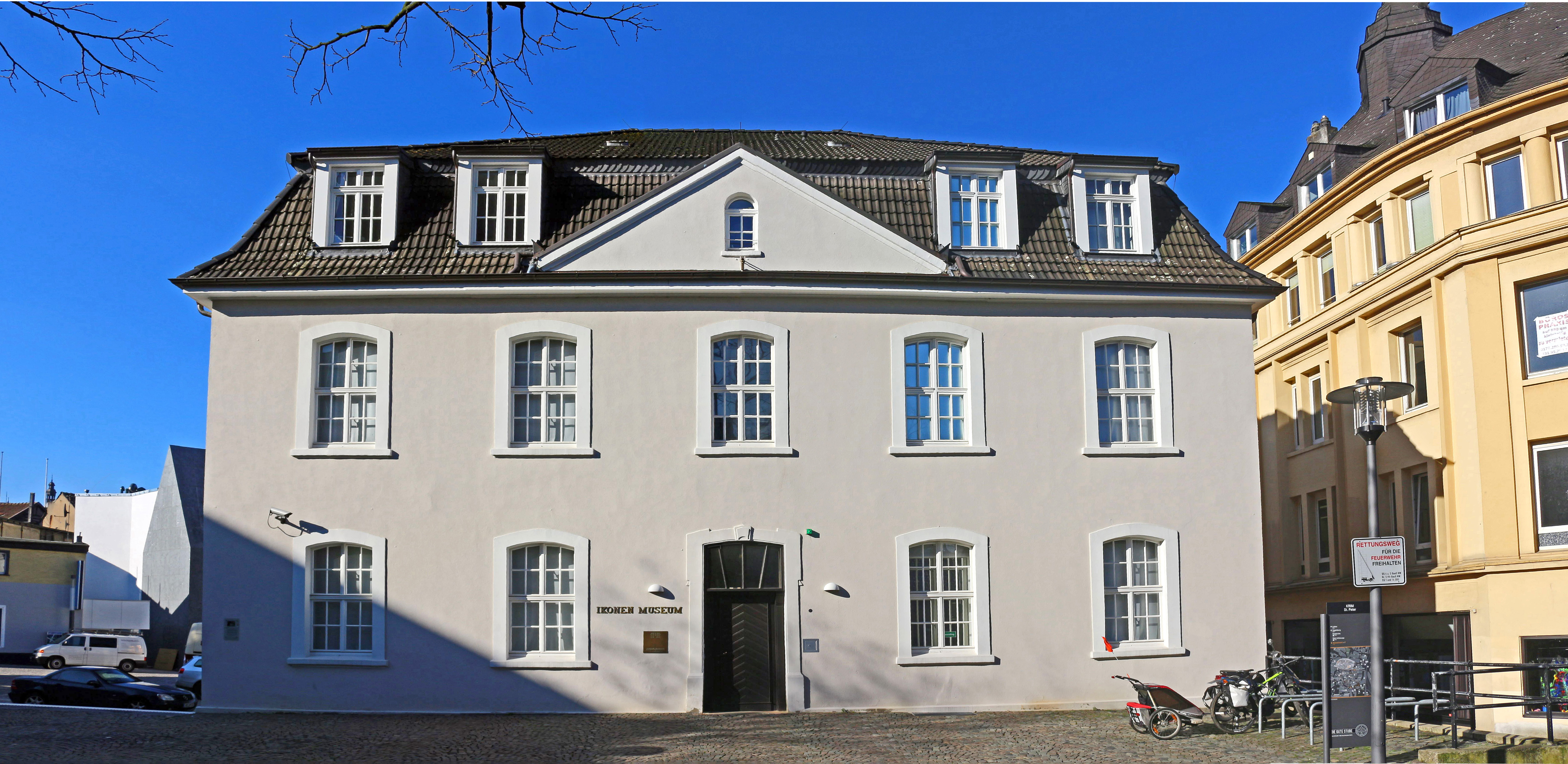
Icon museum of Recklinghausen

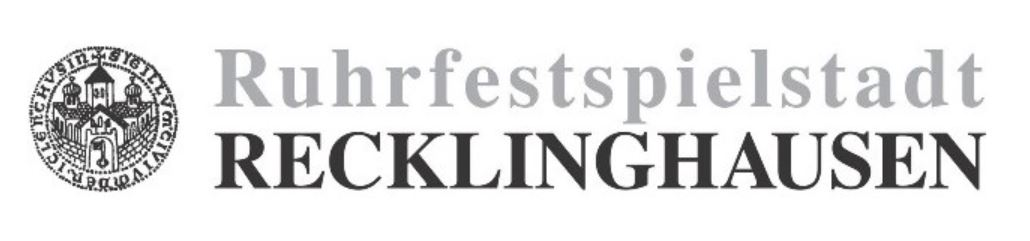
Official logo of Recklinghausen

Recklinghausen is home to a museum of icons, which includes more than 1,000 Orthodox works from Russia, Greece and the Balkan countries, as well as early Coptic Christian art from Egypt. The icon museum – the largest outside the Orthodox world – was founded in 1956 and reopened after renovation in February 2006 for its 50th anniversary.

The Ruhrfestspielhaus (Ruhr Festival Theatre), whose remodeling in 2001 won the German Architecture Award is home of "Die Liegende Nr 5", a famous sculpture by Henry Moore. At the Lohtor in front of a memorial for the victims of World War I, there is a large sculpture made of more than 30,000 bricks by Per Kirkeby.

== Annual events ==
Recklinghausen hosts the annual Ruhrfestspiele (Ruhr Festival), a cultural festival with an international reputation. Every year there is a cultural programme with many national and international theatrical productions starting on 1 May. In 2008 the programme included the play Speed the Plow starring Kevin Spacey and Jeff Goldblum as one of the major productions. The main theatrical stage is the Ruhrfestspielhaus but other theatres in and around Recklinghausen participate.

== Transport ==
The two major motorways crossing the area of the city are the A2 and the A43. The city is connected to the larger waterways by the Rhein-Herne-Kanal. Recklinghausen has two railway stations. The Central Station (Recklinghausen Hauptbahnhof), which is served by Intercity and EuroCity services, and the South Station (Recklinghausen Südbahnhof).

There are two Rhine-Ruhr S-Bahn lines - S 2 to Dortmund via Herne - Castrop-Rauxel and S 9 to Hagen via Gladbeck - Bottrop - Essen - Velbert - Wuppertal.

== Politics ==
=== Mayor ===
The current mayor of Recklinghausen is Axel Tschersich of the Social Democratic Party (SPD). The most recent mayoral election was held on 14 September 2025, and the results were as follows:

Candidate	Party	Votes	%
Alex Tschersich	Social Democratic Party	20,336	43.32
Anja-Christina Rex	Christian Democratic Union	12,212	26.01
Sascha Menkhaus	Alternative for Germany	8,094	17.24
Jan Matzoll	Alliance 90/The Greens	3,517	7.49
Emily Böker	Die PARTEI	887	1.89
Marlies Greve	Free Democratic Party	838	1.78
Hans Knoblauch	WU Recklinghausen	713	1.52
Claudia Ludwig	UBP	351	0.75
Valid votes		46,948	99.41
Invalid votes		281	0.59
Total		47,229	100.0
Electorate/voter turnout		89,058	53.03
Source: City of Recklinghausen

=== City council ===
Results of the 2020 city council election

The Recklinghausen city council governs the city alongside the Mayor. The most recent city council election was held on 13 September 2020, and the results were as follows:

Party	Votes	%	+/-	Seats	+/-
Christian Democratic Union (CDU)	16,078	37.0	▲0.6	21	▲2
Social Democratic Party (SPD)	10,924	25.2	▼12.8	14	▼6
Alliance 90/The Greens (Grüne)	7,757	17.9	▲8.3	10	▲5
Alternative for Germany (AfD)	2,861	6.6	New	4	New
The Left (Die Linke)	1,867	4.3	▼1.7	2	▼1
Free Democratic Party (FDP)	1,561	3.6	▲0.4	2	±0
Independent Citizens' Party (UBP)	1,477	3.4	▼3.4	2	▼1
Die PARTEI	614	1.4	New	1	New
Ecological Democratic Party (ÖDP)	199	0.5	New	0	New
Party of Holistic Democracy (PHD)	103	0.2	New	0	New
Valid votes	43,441	98.4			
Invalid votes	687	1.6			
Total	44,128	100.0		56	▲4
Electorate/voter turnout	92,107	47.9	▼0.4		
Source: City of Recklinghausen Archived 2021-09-23 at the Wayback Machine

== Twin towns – sister cities ==
Recklinghausen is twinned with:

- Acre, Israel
- Bytom, Poland
- Dordrecht, Netherlands
- Douai, France
- Preston, England, United Kingdom
- Schmalkalden, Germany

== Notable people ==
- Louis Engelbert, 6th Duke of Arenberg (1750–1820), prince of Recklinghausen
- Prosper Louis, 7th Duke of Arenberg (1785–1861), 2nd prince of Recklinghausen
- Fritz Emil Irrgang (1890–1951), Nazi politician and storm trooper
- Erich Bödeker (1904–1971), artist
- Walter Giller (1927–2011), actor
- Karl Ridderbusch (1932–1997), opera singer
- Ursula Dirichs (born 1935), actress
- Rosemarie Koczy (1939–2007), artist and teacher, concentration camp survivor
- Klaus Schulten (1947–2016), biophysicist
- Renate Künast (born 1955), politician (Alliance 90/The Greens)
- Ralf Möller (born 1959), actor
- Ludger Pistor (born 1959), actor
- Hape Kerkeling (born 1964), comedian and author
- Steffen Brand (born 1965), runner
- Martin Max (born 1968), footballer
- Mark Dragunski (born 1970), handball player
- Moguai (born 1973), DJ and producer
- Frank Busemann (born 1975), decathlete
- Thomas Godoj (born 1978), Polish-German singer, Deutschland sucht den Superstar winner
- Nina Jazy (born 2005), swimmer
- Ayliva (born 1998), singer

=== Mayors since 1809 ===
Bürgermeister

- 1809–1833: Alois Joseph Wulff
- 1833–1839: Peter Banniza
- 1840–1842: Karl Boelmann
- 1843–1850: Franz Bracht
- 1854–1890: Friedrich Hagemann
- 1890–1899: Alexander Rensing

Oberbürgermeister

- 1899–1904: Albert von Bruchhausen
- 1904–1919: Peter Heuser
- 1919–1931: Sulpiz Hamm
- 1932–1939: Fritz Niemeyer
- 1939–1945: Fritz Emil Irrgang, NSDAP
- 1945–1946: Josef Hellermann, CDU
- 1946–1948: Wilhelm Bitter, CDU
- 1948–1952: Joseph Dünnebacke, CDU
- 1952–1972: Heinrich Auge, SPD
- 1972–1984: Erich Wolfram, SPD

Bürgermeister

- 1984–1987: Erich Wolfram, SPD
- 1987–1998: Jochen Welt, SPD

Hauptamtliche Bürgermeister

- 1998–1999: Peter Borggraefe, SPD
- 1999–2014: Wolfgang Pantförder, CDU
- 2014–2026: Christoph Tesche, CDU

== Gallery ==
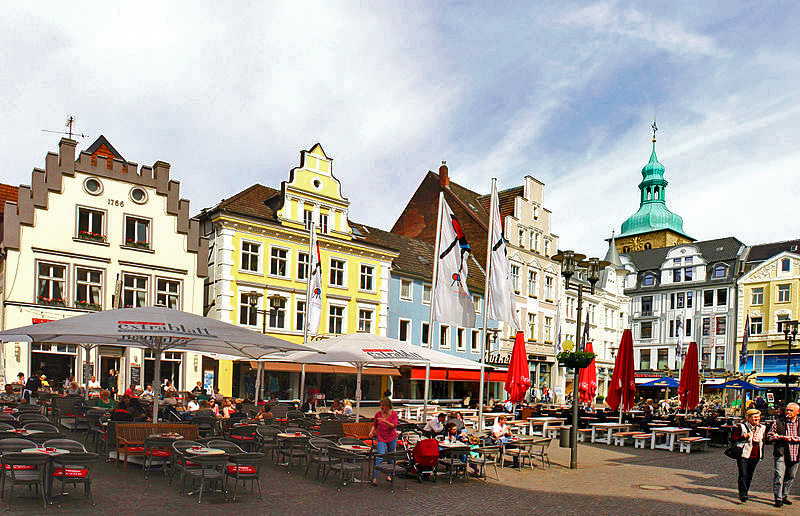
Central market

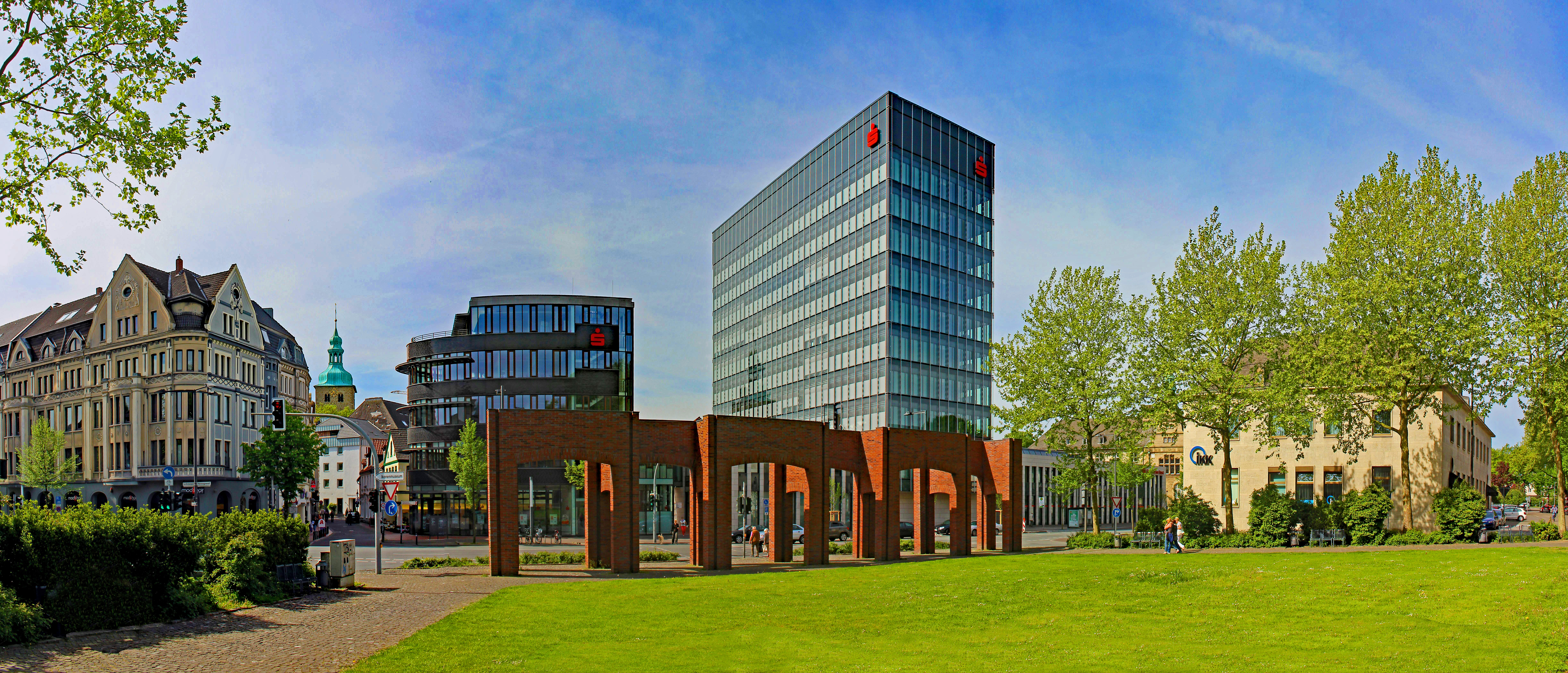
Lohtor Square with Saint Peter's Church and sculpture of Per Kirkeby

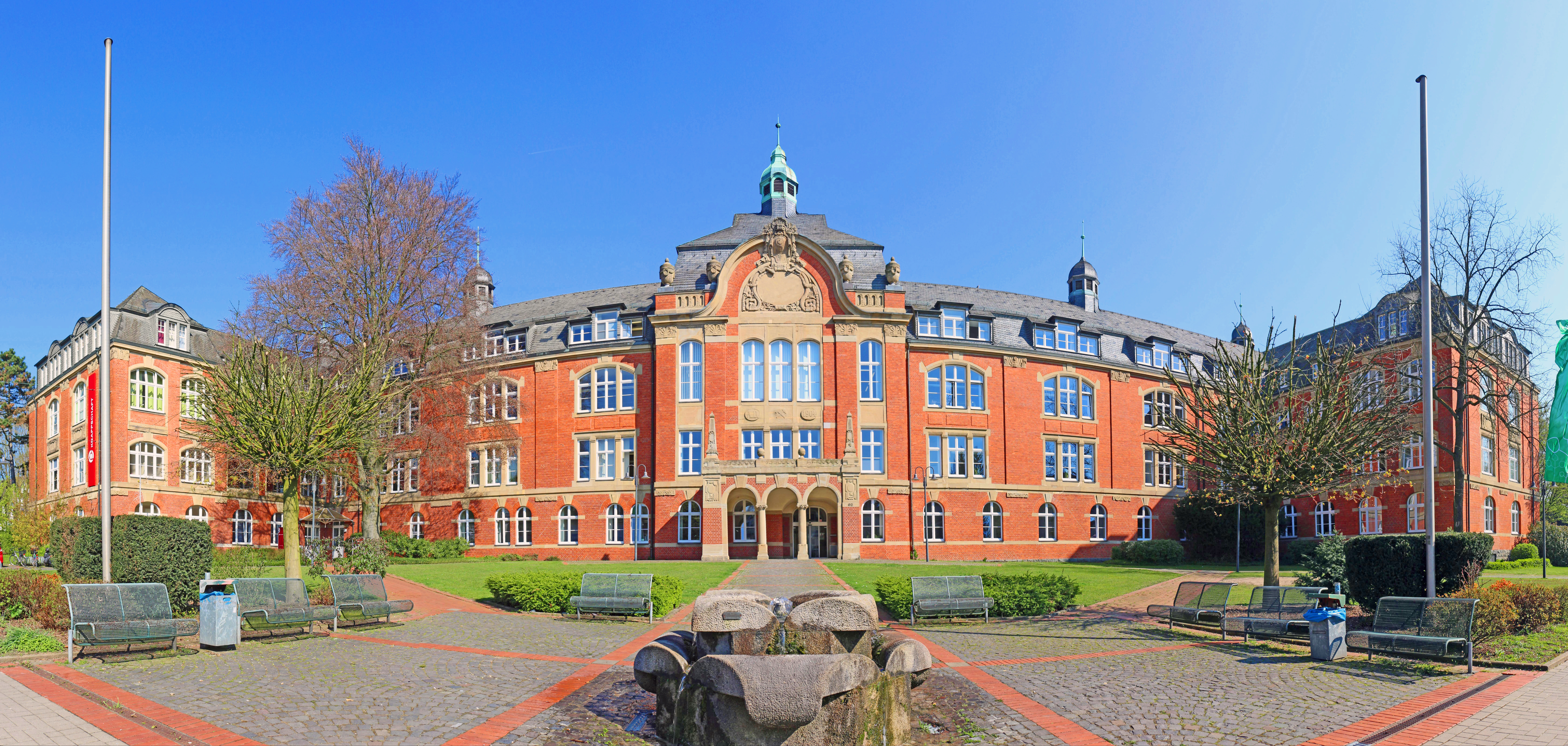
Former hospital in Westviertel

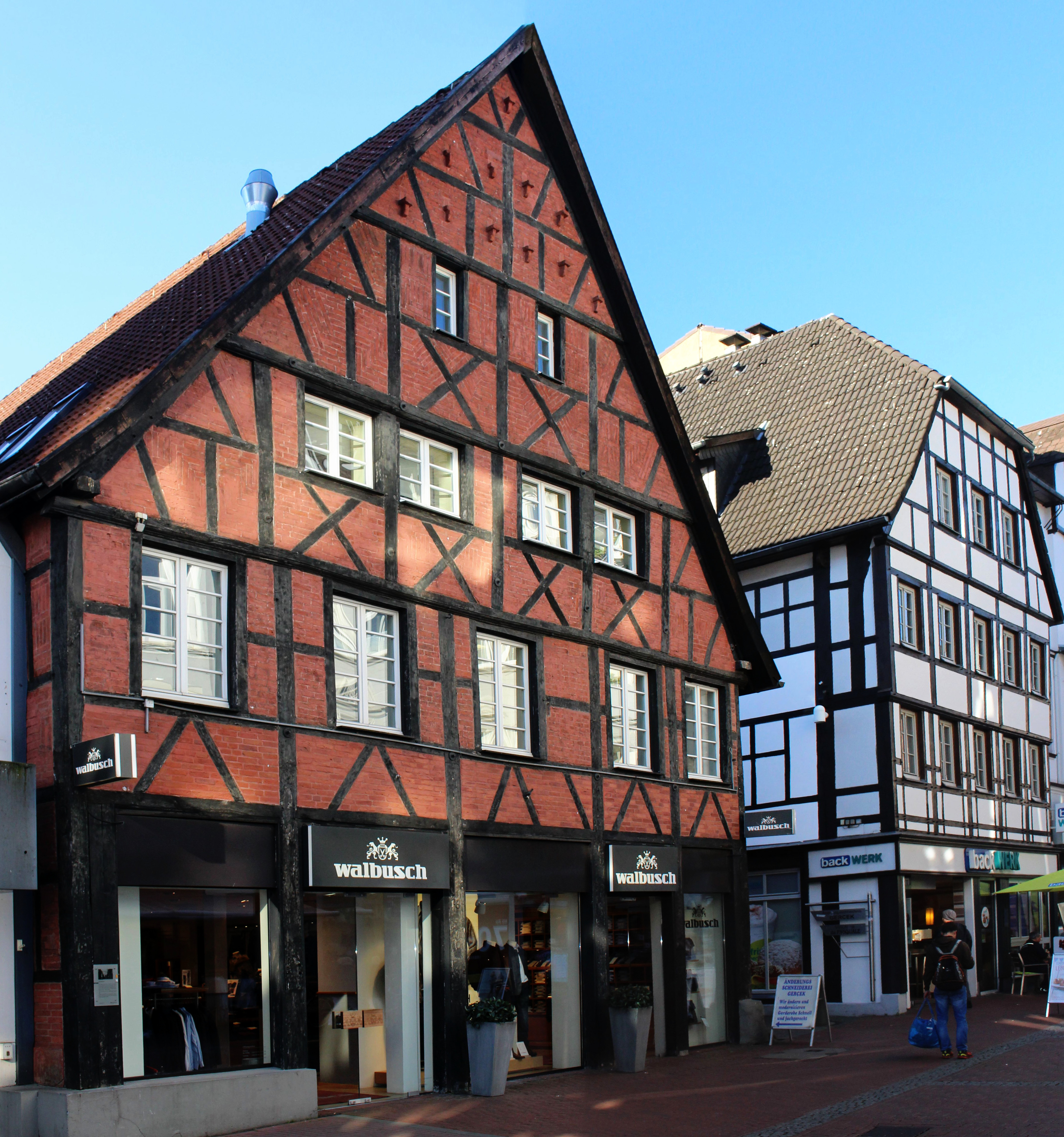
Half-timber houses in the city

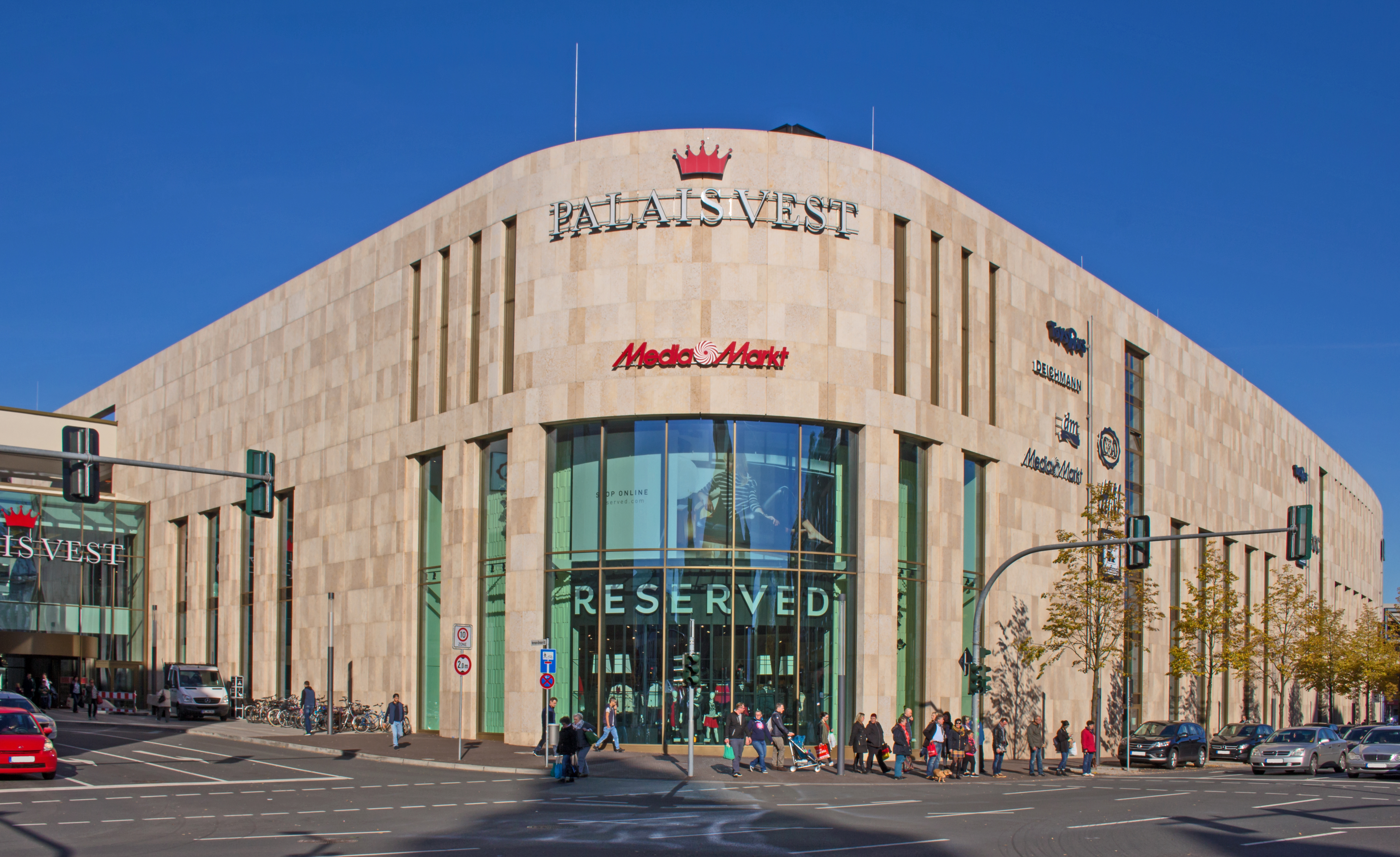
The "Palais Vest" shopping mall

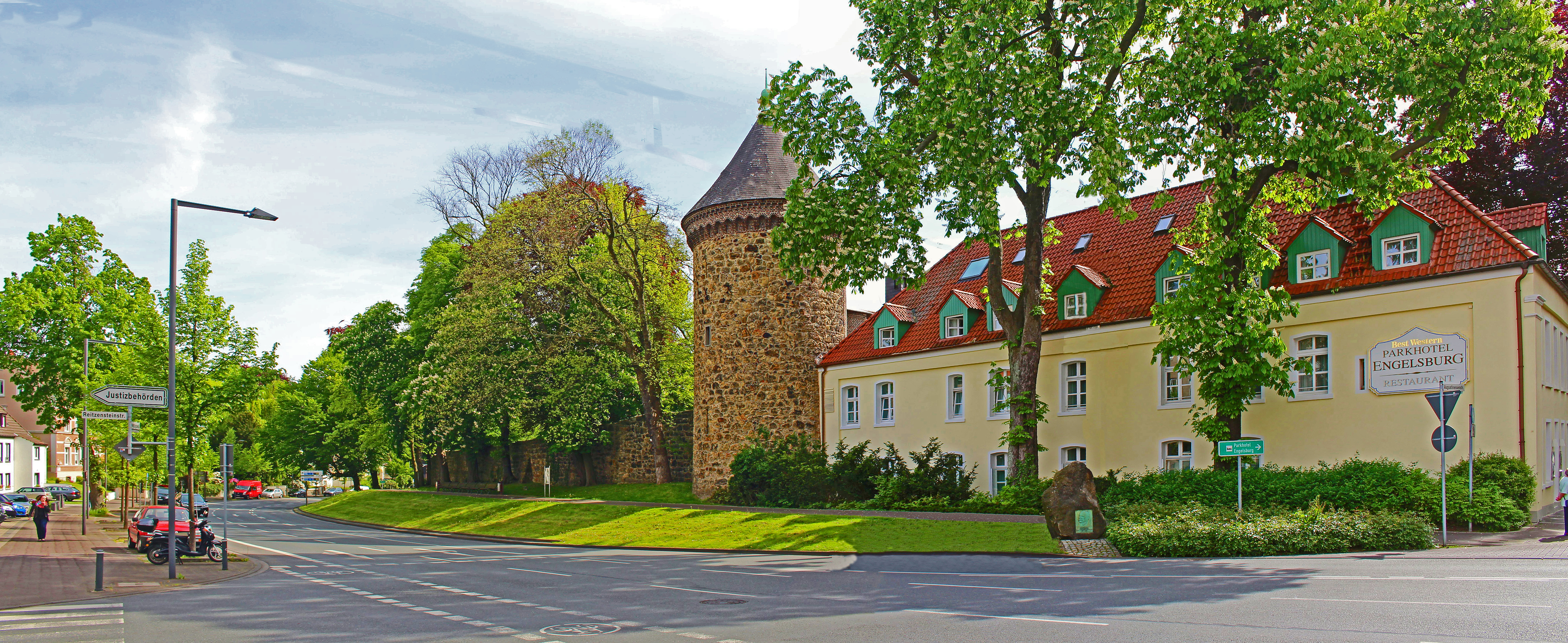
City wall from the Middle Ages
