= Stadtarchiv Stralsund =

Coordinates: 54°19′1″N 13°5′31″E

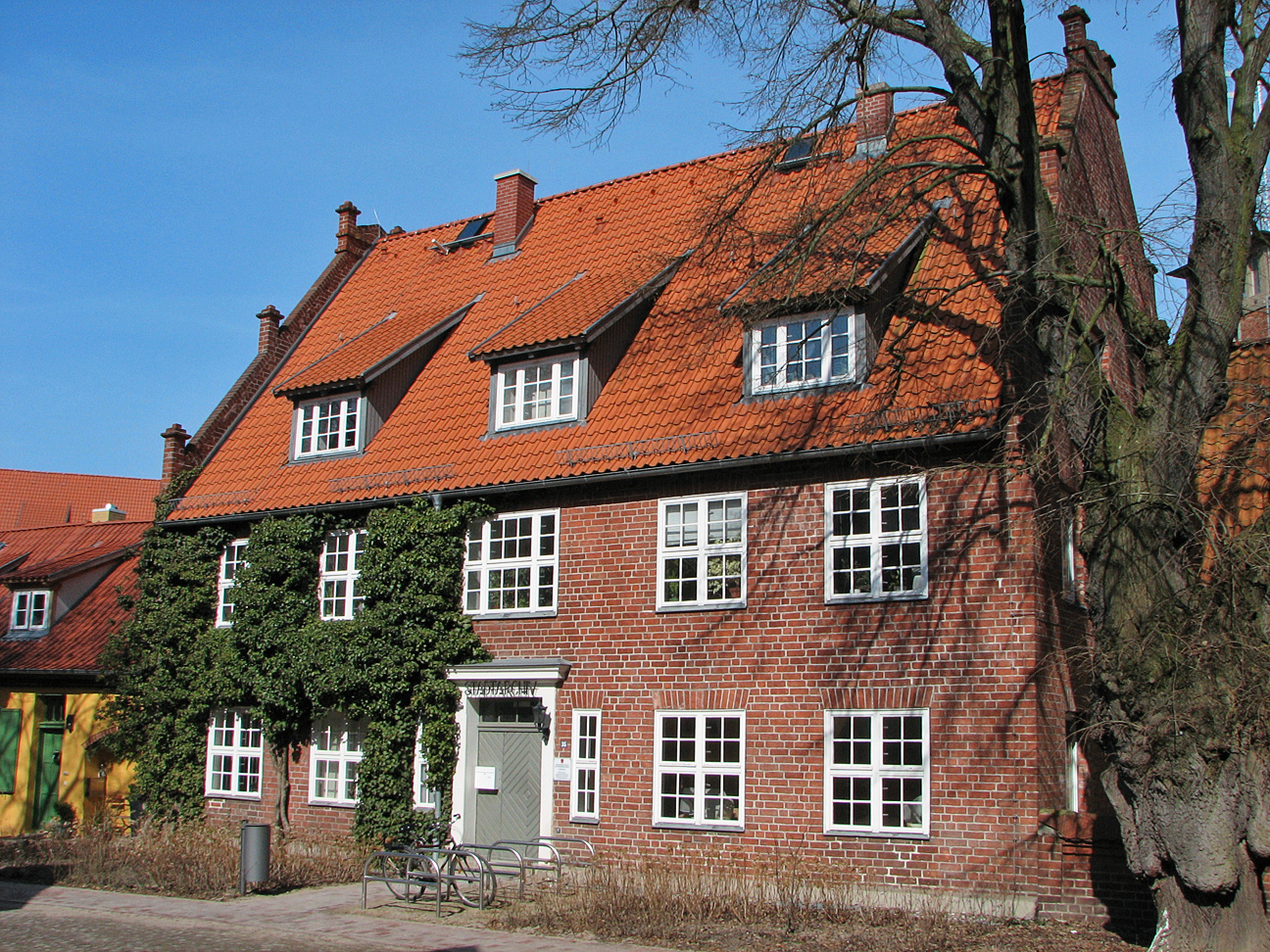
Stadtarchiv (2006)

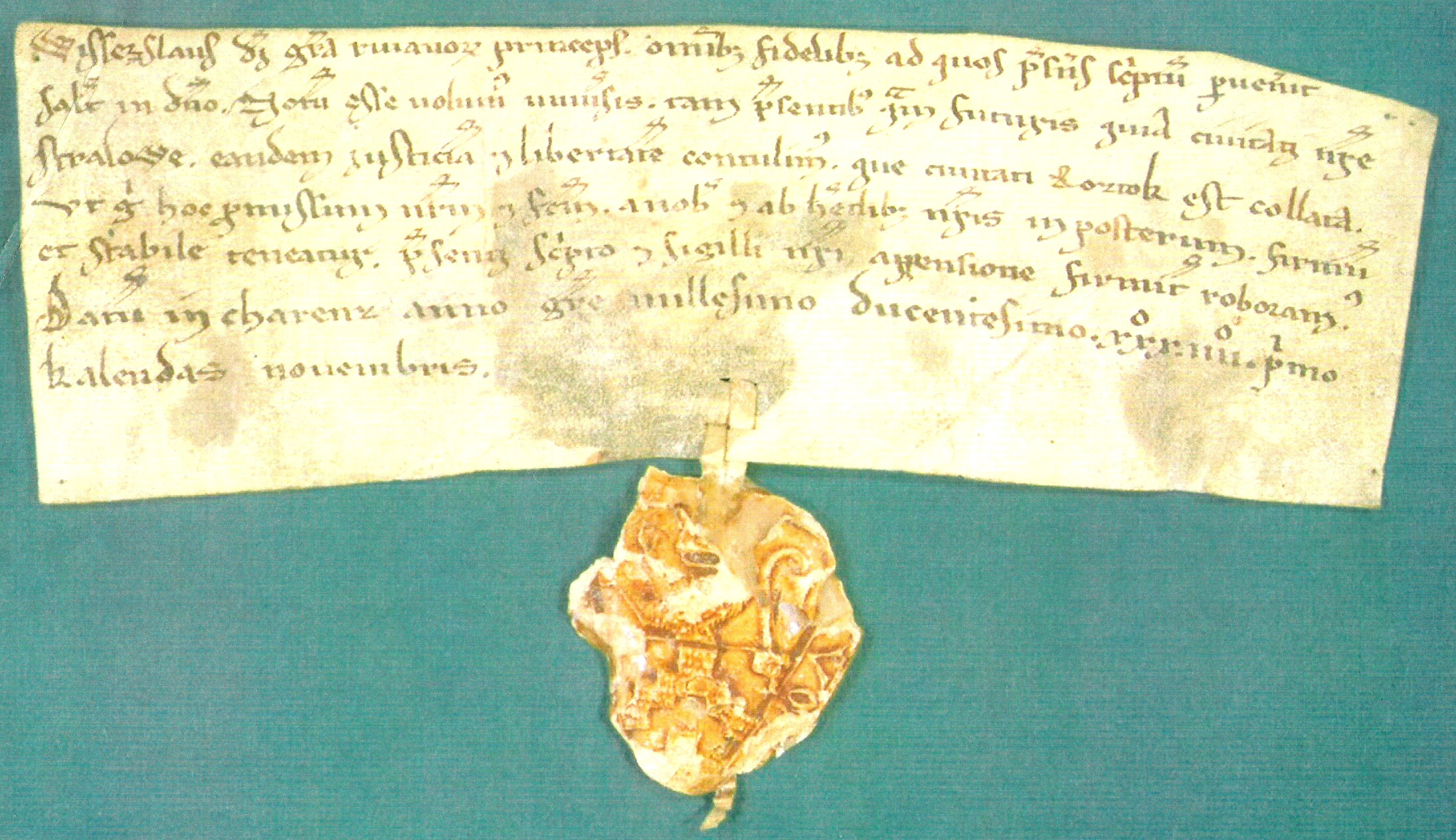
Stralsund city charter, 1234

The Stadtarchiv Stralsund (City Archives of Stralsund) is the historical Archive of the Hanseatic City of Stralsund and an important municipal archive in Mecklenburg-Vorpommern.

The Stadtarchiv Stralsund ranks among the important communal archives in Europe, as it covers the city's role in the Hanseatic League and the history of Swedish Pomerania. This municipal archive has been taking custody of records in Stralsund since the Middle Ages.

The study facilities for the archives are in the Johanniskloster (St. John's Monastery).
