= European Journalism Observatory =

The European Journalism Observatory (EJO) is a network of media research institutes sharing a common goal: to serve as a bridge between media researchers and practising journalists, to make the results of research accessible to a wider audience, and to promote “best practices” in journalism. The EJO aims to contribute to a richer understanding of different journalism cultures, to facilitate collaboration between media researchers and practitioners in Europe and the United States, and to foster press freedom.

== History ==
The European Journalism Observatory was established in 2004 at the Università della Svizzera italiana (USI) in Lugano, Switzerland, by Stephan Russ-Mohl, then Professor of Journalism and Media Management at USI. Though one of the aims of the EJO was to encourage cooperation and the sharing of knowledge between media researchers and journalists in western Europe and their counterparts in the former Eastern bloc countries that joined the European Union in 2004, at first its publications were available only in English, German and Italian. A Polish website was launched in 2007, and in 2011/12 six more Eastern European languages were added. The EJO currently consists of a network of websites in 13 different languages (Albanian, Czech, English, French, German, Hungarian, Italian, Latvian, Polish, Portuguese, Russian, Spanish and Ukrainian). In addition, it has a partnership with the Arab Journalism Observatory, based in Tunisia, which runs websites in Arabic and French., and collaborates with journalism scholars in Canada.

From 2013 to 2020, the English-language site was hosted by the Reuters Institute for the Study of Journalism (RISJ), a UK-based research centre and think tank.

In September 2020, the Department of Journalism at City, University of London took over the hosting of the English-language site from the Reuters Institute.

Over the years, the EJO has received financial assistance from a variety of sources, including the foundation of Corriere del Ticino, the Swiss National Science Foundation, the Stiftung Presse-Haus NRZ and the Robert Bosch Stiftung, in addition to being supported by the academic institutions that host the various language websites.

== Awards ==
In 2005 the EJO won the Swiss Association for Quality in Journalism award for outstanding achievement and dedication to the promotion of high-quality journalism.

In 2019 the EJO received the Günter Wallraff Prize for the critical analysis of journalism.

== Languages ==
EJO content is currently available online in:

• Albanian

• Czech

• French

• English

• German

• Hungarian

• Italian

• Latvian

• Polish

• Portuguese

• Russian

• Spanish

• Ukrainian
