= Thernstrom =

Thernstrom is a surname. Notable people with the surname include:

- Abigail Thernstrom (1936–2020), American political scientist
- Melanie Thernstrom (born 1964), American crime writer
- Stephan Thernstrom (1934–2025), American historian
