= Southwest Miami Senior High School =

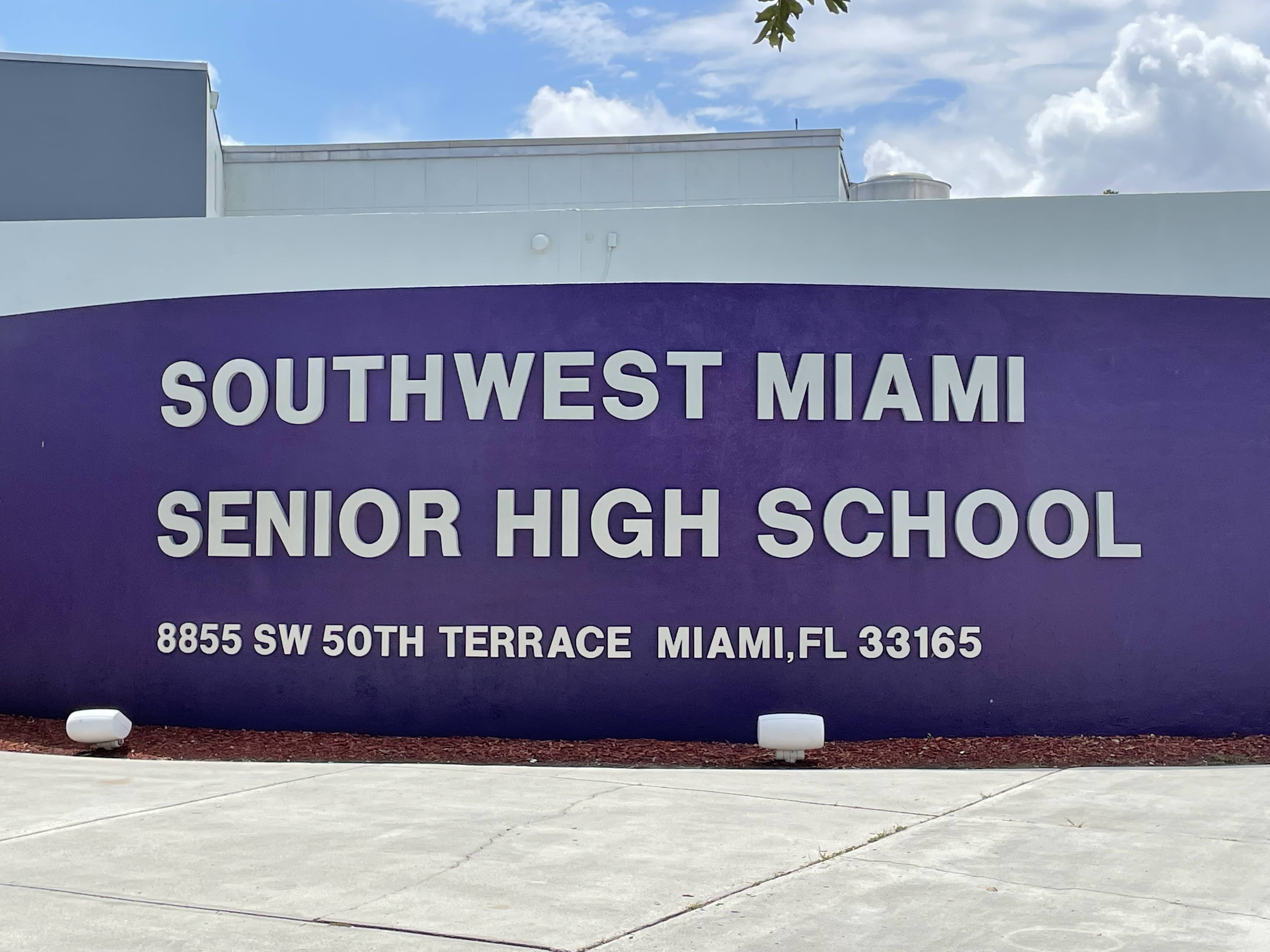
- Front entrance of Southwest Miami Senior High School

Location
- 8855 SW 50th Terrace; Olympia Heights, Florida, Florida 33165; United States; 25.72246°N 80.33839°W

Information
- Type: Public secondary
- Established: 1956; 70 years ago
- School district: Miami-Dade County Public Schools
- Principal: Jorge M. Bulnes (Mr. B)
- Teaching staff: 110.00 (FTE)
- Grades: 9–12
- Enrollment: 2,523 (2023-2024)
- Student to teacher ratio: 22.94
- Hours in school day: 7 (7:20 AM to 2:20 PM)
- Campus type: Suburban
- Colors: Purple, black and white
- Mascot: Eagle
- Yearbook: Aquila
- Website: www.southwestmiamieagles.net

Southwest Miami Senior High School, colloquially known as simply "Southwest", is a co-educational secondary school in Olympia Heights, Florida, a census-designated place in Miami-Dade County, Florida, United States. Southwest is currently an 'A' school and of the more than 30 public schools that are neither all magnet schools nor charter schools, Southwest is ranked the second-best public high school in Miami-Dade County by U.S. News & World Report.

== History ==
Southwest Miami High School was founded in September 1956 as Southwest Miami Junior Senior High School. The school was built to alleviate overcrowding at neighboring Coral Gables Senior High School. The school educated students in 7th to 10th grades. In 1959, it was transformed into a high school.

Southwest was built to alleviate crowding at Coral Gables Senior High School, and a rivalry formed between the two schools. Both schools would meet annually in what was dubbed the Turkey Bowl. Unfortunately for the Eagles, this rivalry was comparable to the hammer and the nail, in which the Eagles were the nail. After the 1960s, Southwest failed to beat Gables for over 30 years, finally beating them in 1995. However, beginning in the early 1980s, a new rival had begun to show up, Coral Park. This rivalry began to show up due to the construction of South Miami High School, which removed the boundary border that Southwest shared with Gables. Due to this, Southwest began to share a new boundary border with Coral Park. Both schools meet annually in football and basketball, in which the rivalry is most prominent.

In the 2010s, Southwest removed 2 parking lots on its north side, removed portable classrooms, and constructed a new 2 story building which now houses classes such as cosmetology, gaming, Artificial Intelligence, Art, AP, and SPED classes. The 400s B wing was expanded to include an Auto mechanic workshop and a Woodworking class. Additionally, a new courtyard filled the area of 1 of the parking lots, which now serves as a parent and bus drop off area.

For the 2021-2022 school year, a General Obligation bond project by the county funded renovations. The $16.3 million project included campus-wide window replacement, restroom renovations and installation of a parent drop-off area. Additionally, the school was painted, and the gymnasium floor was replaced.

== Demographics ==
Southwest Miami High School is 95% Hispanic, 4% White and 1% other.

Southwest has the fourth largest Hispanic population of public high schools in Miami Dade. The school’s population has recently exploded, increasing from 2,278 students in 2022 to 2,415 in 2024. This is largely attributed to an increase in transfers from surrounding schools, recent increase in Cuban arrivals, and lower number of transfers to other schools.

== Student media ==
The student newspaper was the Lancer, the yearbook is Aquila (Latin for "eagle"), and the student council is responsible for the morning announcements. Every week, the “Eagles in Flight” is published, which lays out events occurring in the school for the week.

== Performing arts ==
The Royal Lancer marching band performs in the rival and homecoming football game. The Illusion dancers and the Southwest Thespians perform throughout the school year.

== Athletic achievements ==
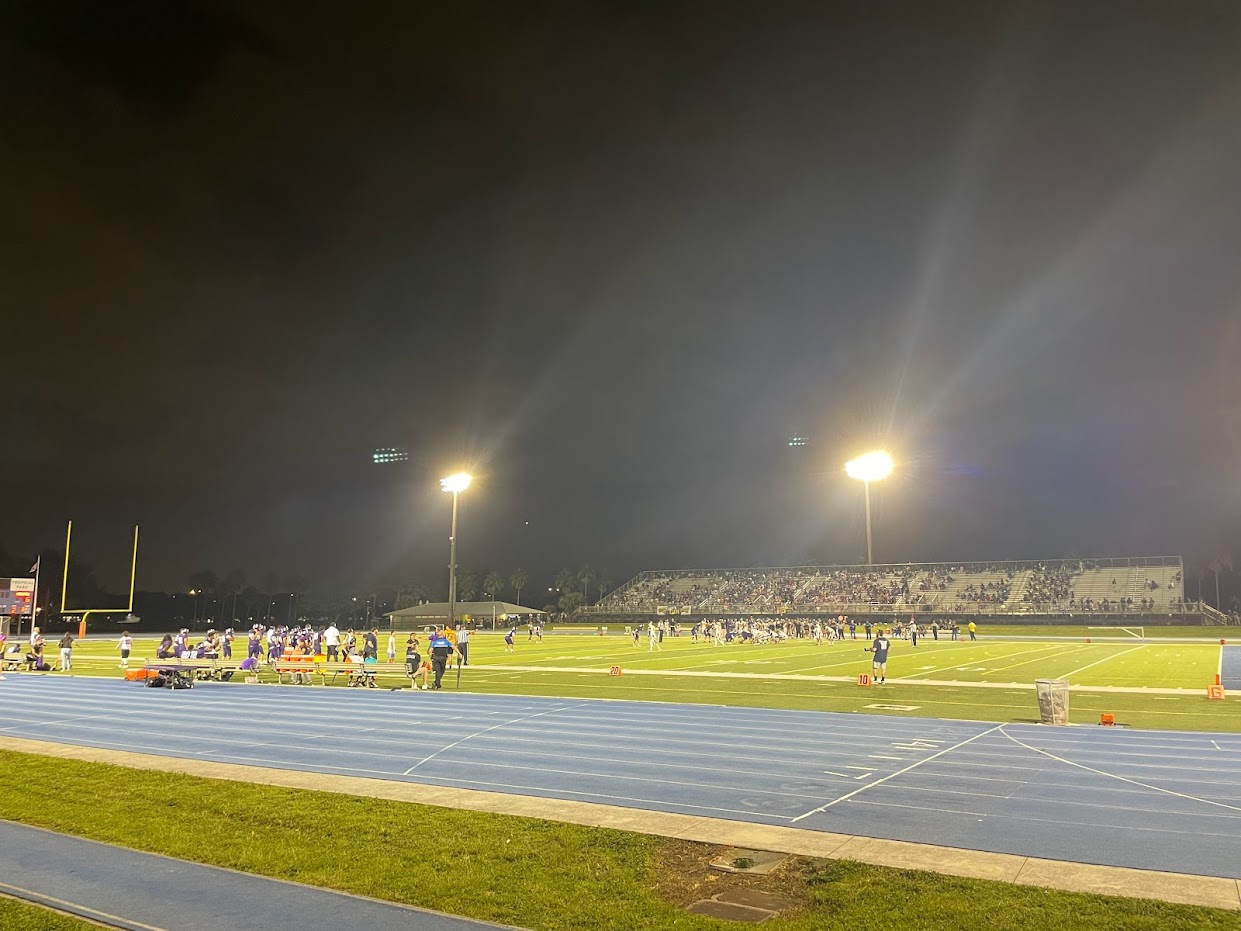
The Westchester Classico - Football game between Southwest Miami Senior High School and Miami Coral Park Senior High School

Southwest has a rich history in athletics. By the time the first graduating class (1959) donned their caps and gowns, the Eagles had already won state championships in boys' basketball and boys' track. On May 7, 1964, Southwest became the first Dade County white school to face a black school in a sport other than track when it took on George Washington Carver Senior High School in baseball. The Florida High School Athletic Association began sponsoring state championships in boys' volleyball in 2003 and, in the first eight years of the state tournament, the Eagles took home two state championships.

In 2010, alumnus Andre Dawson was inducted into the National Baseball Hall of Fame. The baseball field at Southwest is named in his honor.

In football, Southwest has an up and down history in football. The Eagles defeated South Broward, 7-6, to win the 1958 Gold Coast Conference championship. In 1959, just a few months after the school's first graduating class left school, the football team went undefeated, its record blemished only by ties with Coral Gables and Key West. The program fell on hard times in the 1970s and 1980s and failed to defeat the then rival Coral Gables. That was also the year Southwest made its first appearance in the state playoffs. The Eagles again defeated Coral Gables in 2011 and 2012. Southwest won its first district championship in football in 2008 under coach Patrick Burrows and repeated as champions in 2012 and 2013 under the leadership of coach Tim Neal. Entering the 2017 season, the Eagles had qualified for the state playoffs five years in a row. As of the 2024 season, the Eagles have beat rival Coral Park in 19 out of the last 21 games, losing in 2022 and 2010.

=== State championships ===
Girls' cross country (individual)

1976: Katherine Moore - 1.5 miles

Boys' swimming (individual):

1965: Michael W. Sheeler - 100 yard breaststroke, Michael W. Sheeler - 200 yard medley, 1966: Michael W. Sheeler - 200 yard medley, 1969: Gregory Gibble - 50 yard freestyle, Gregory Gibble - 100 yard freestyle

Girls swimming (individual):

1964 Linda Sheeler - 500 yard freestyle, 1965 Linda Sheeler - 200 yard freestyle, Linda Sheeler - 500 yard freestyle, 1978 Julie Olson - one meter diving

Boys' basketball: 1959
Boys' bowling: 1977 Stanley Kodish Bowler of the Year
Wrestling (individual):

1965: Jim Hammack - 185 lbs, 1970: Mike Williams - 145 lbs, 1971: John Williams - 167 lbs, 1972: Charles Mack - 135 lbs, Robert Horback - 155 lbs, 1974: Bob DeMarco - 112 lbs, 1976: Luis Alvarez - 135 lbs, 1988: Ivan Huergo - 145 lbs, 1989: Joel Mendez - 119 lbs, Gus Hernandez - 130 lbs, 1996: Wesley Woodrome - 140 lbs, 2005: Denys Ribot - 152 lbs, 2012: Yoanse Mejia - 145 lbs, 2013: Nosomy Poso - 132 lbs, 2014: Franco Valdes - 120 lbs, 2017: Angel Del Cueto - 170 lbs, 2018: Alexis Urquiza - 138 lbs, 2019: Julian Hernandez - 145 lbs, 2022: Gabriel Tellez - 106 lbs

Boys' volleyball: 2003, 2008, 2023
Softball: 2004
Boys' track (team): 1959, 1971
Boys' track (individual):

1959: John DeCosta - 120 yard high hurdles, John DeCosta - 180 yard low hurdles, Paul Skeans - discus, 1960: Richard Dobbs - discus, 1961: Ron Pascarella - discus, 1962: Ron Pascarella - discus

Girls' track (individual):

1977: Katherine Moore - one mile run, Katherine Moore - two mile run, 1988: Barbara Ortiz - two mile run

== Notable alumni ==
=== Athletics ===
==== Baseball ====
- Dave Augustine, Class of 1967 - outfielder with the Pittsburgh Pirates (1973–1974)
- Ray Bare, Class of 1967 - pitcher with the St. Louis Cardinals (1972, 1974) and Detroit Tigers (1975–1977)
- Carlos Castillo, Class of 1994 - pitcher with the Chicago White Sox (1997–1999) and Boston Red Sox (2001)
- Andre Dawson, Class of 1972 - outfielder with the Montreal Expos (1976–1986), Chicago Cubs (1987–1992), Boston Red Sox (1993–1994) and Florida Marlins (1995–1996)
- Fernando Hernandez, Class of 2002 - pitcher with the Oakland Athletics (2008)
- Hansel Izquierdo, Class of 1995 - pitcher with the Florida Marlins (2002)
- Dane Johnson, Class of 1981 - pitcher with the Chicago White Sox (1994), Toronto Blue Jays (1996), and Oakland Athletics (1997)
- Juan Peña, Class of 1994 - pitcher with the Boston Red Sox (1999)
- Michael Tejera, Class of 1995 - pitcher with the Florida Marlins (1999, 2002–2004) and Texas Rangers (2004–2005)
- Jeff Urgelles, Class of 2000 - former bullpen coordinator with the Miami Marlins (2010–2017)

==== Basketball ====
- Jose Fernandez, Class of 1989 - head coach of the University of South Florida women's basketball team

==== Football ====
- Randy Burke, Class of 1973 - wide receiver with the Baltimore Colts (1977, first round pick)
- Tony Chickillo, Class of 1978- defensive line with the Tampa Bay Buccaneers (1983, fifth round pick), also played for the San Diego Chargers (1984–1985) and the New York Jets (1987)
- Steve Tannen, Class of 1966 - defensive back with the New York Jets (1970, first round pick)

==== Swimming ====
- David Marsh, Class of 1976 - won 12 national titles as coach at Auburn University, and served as head coach of the U.S. Women's Swimming Team at the 2016 Rio Olympics.

=== Government ===
- Ileana Ros-Lehtinen, Class of 1970 - Member of the U.S. House of Representatives (1989–2019)
- Carol Browner, Class of 1973 - administrator of the Environmental Protection Agency (1993–2001)
- Dario Herrera, Class of 1991 - member of the Nevada Assembly (1997–1999); Clark County, Nevada commissioner (1999–2003)

=== Other ===
- Charlie McCoy, Class of 1959 - member Country Music Hall of Fame and Museum
- Ed Calle, Class of 1977 - musician
- Alberto Cutié, Class of 1987 - Episcopal cleric, former Roman Catholic priest
- Jonathan Demme, Class of 1962 - film director
- Teresita Fernandez, Class of 1986 - artist
- Lissette Garcia, Class of 2003 - Miss Florida USA 2011
- Lindsay Hyde, Class of 2000 - founder and President of Strong Women Strong Girls
- Jim Lampley, Class of 1966 - sportscaster
- D. S. Lliteras, Class of 1967 - author
