= Teresita Fernández =

American artist

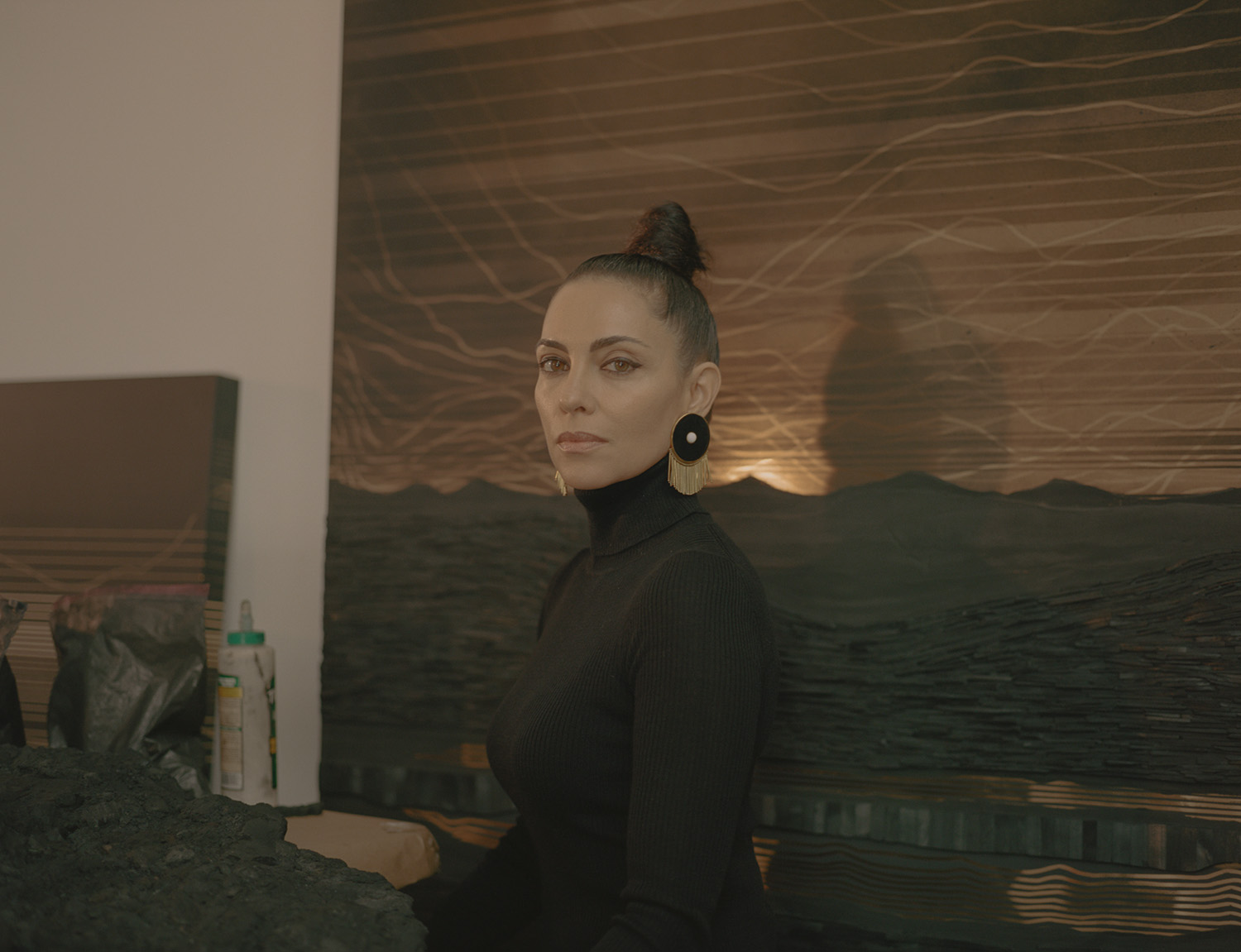
- Fernández in 2018
- Born: 1968 (age 57–58); Miami, Florida, United States
- Education: Southwest Miami High School; Florida International University; Virginia Commonwealth University
- Awards: MacArthur Genius Grant, Guggenheim, National Endowment for the Arts

Teresita Fernández (born 1968) is a New York-based visual artist best known for her public sculptures and unconventional use of materials. Her work is characterized by a reconsideration of landscape and issues of visibility. Fernández's practice generates psychological topographies that prompt the subjective reshaping of spatial and historical awareness. Her experiential, large-scale works are often inspired by natural landscapes, investigating the historical, geological, and anthropological realms in flux. Her sculptures present optical illusions and evoke natural phenomena, land formations, and water.

Throughout her career, Fernández has experimented with a diverse array of materials. Ranging from ceramics, glass, and charcoal to gold and graphite, the varied mediums prompt the viewers to take a closer look at each work to contemplate the materialities. To Fernández, materials—at times found subterraneously and are physical remnants of a place—are a testament to the historical past and tangible facts. Fernández refers to her works as “stacked landscapes,” alluding to the process of layering meanings and materials to her sculptural plane. In this process, Fernández's landscape sculptures delve into complex themes of self-perception, colonialism, and historical violence associated with the environment and body.

She is a recipient of a Guggenheim Fellowship (2003), and the John D. and Catherine T. MacArthur Foundation "Genius Grant" (2005). In 2011, she served as a presidential appointee to Barack Obama's U.S. Commission of Fine Arts, distinguishing her as the first Latina to serve in that role. In 2022 she was elected to the American Academy of Arts and Sciences.

== Early life and education ==
Fernández was born in Miami, Florida to Cuban parents in exile. Her family left Cuba in July 1959, six months after the Cuban Revolution. As a child, she spent much of her time creating in the atelier of her great aunts and grandmother, all of whom had been trained as highly skilled couture seamstresses in Havana, Cuba.

In 1986, Fernández graduated from Southwest Miami High School. She received a Bachelor of Fine Arts from Florida International University in 1990, and a Masters of Fine Art from Virginia Commonwealth University in 1992.

== Career ==
In 2009 the Blanton Museum of Art at the University of Texas at Austin commissioned the large permanent work titled Stacked Waters that occupies the museum's Rapoport Atrium. Stacked Waters consists of 3,100 square feet of custom-cast acrylic that covers the walls in a striped pattern. The work's title alludes to artist Donald Judd's "stacked" sculptures—a series of identical boxes installed vertically along wall surfaces—as well as to his sculptural explorations of box interiors. Fernández noticed how The Blanton's atrium functions like a box, and given its architectural nods to the arches of Roman baths and cisterns, she sought to fill its spatial volume with an illusion of water.

Also in 2009, Fernández debuted the permanent, site-specific commission Blind Blue Landscape at the Benesse Art Site, Naoshima. The work consists of a collection of glass cubes, illustrating a reflective landscape. This work is on view at the Benesse House hotel complex. The artist also debuted a similar commissioned work called Starfield, made up of mirrored glass cubes on anodized aluminum in the AT&T Stadium in Arlington, Texas.

In 2013, Fernández was featured in a contemporary art installation at Cornell Fine Arts Museum's Alfond Inn in Winter Park, FL. The work displayed was titled "Nocturnal (Cobalt Panorama)".

In 2014, Fernández was the subject of a solo-exhibition with Mass MoCA, Teresita Fernández: As Above So Below, in conjunction with the museum's fifteenth-year celebration. In Mass MoCA's first floor gallery spaces, she exhibited her three new landscape-informed, large-scale installations: Black Sun, Sfumato (Epic), and Lunar (Theatre).

On June 1, 2015, Fata Morgana, her largest public art project to date and the largest installation in the park's history, opened in New York's Madison Square Park. The Madison Square Park Conservancy presented the outdoor sculpture consisting of 500 running feet of golden, mirror-polished discs that create canopies above the pathways around the park's central Oval Lawn. Fata Morgana reflects the artist's immersive sensibilities where the act of living and moving through spaces influence her practice.

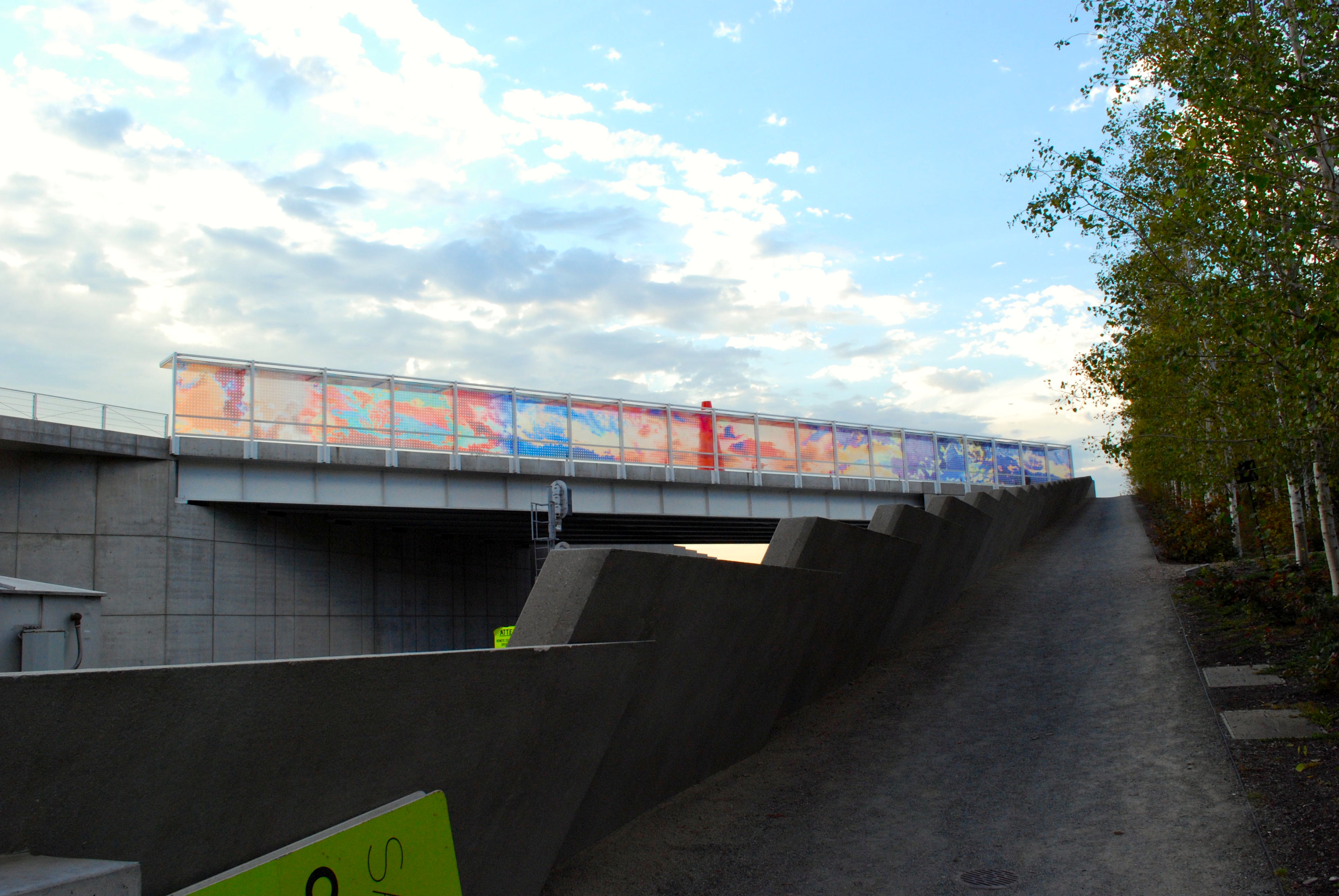
Seattle Cloud Cover (public commission, 2006)

In 2017, Fernández, in collaboration with Colección Patricia Phelps de Cisneros, created a site-specific installation called OVERLOOK: Teresita Fernández confronts Frederic Church at Olana at Olana State Historic Site. In this work, Fernández contests the traditional “American Landscape” painting tradition, combining portraits of indigenous people, expansive horizon lines, and botanical imagery to prioritize the individual within the landscape.

Harvard University Committee on the Arts commissioned Autumn (... Nothing Personal) a public art project by Fernández in 2018. The circular installation was placed in Tercentenary Theatre Harvard Yard, serving as a physical space for public dialogue and performance.

In 2019, the Pérez Art Museum Miami and Phoenix Art Museum organized Teresita Fernández: Elemental, the artist's first mid-career retrospective presenting artworks spanning the 1990s to the present. The exhibition featured sculptures, installations, and several other mixed media works to comment on social, geological, and political issues. The publication accompanying the show was published by PAMM with Phoenix Art Museum.

Also in 2019, Fernández was commissioned to create a permanent, site-specific glazed ceramic installation Viñales(Mayombe Mississippi) for the Sydney and Walda Besthoff Sculpture Garden at the New Orleans Museum of Art (NOMA). Viñales(Mayombe Mississippi) is a 60-foot-long ceramic mural, placed on the exterior wall of the garden's Pavilion. The installation draws inspiration from her previous Viñales series, which embodies Fernández's interest in combining earthly materials with a conceptual approach to place and image-making.

In 2021, Fernández exhibited "Dark Earth" in the Maria & Alberto de la Cruz Art Gallery at Georgetown University. The exhibit featured a panoramic wall made from charcoal and punctuated with reflective, golden panels.

From 2021 to 2023, Fernández participated in Philadelphia Museum of Art’s Teresita Fernández: Fire (United States of the Americas), unveiling her site-specific Fire (United States of the Americas), which inaugurated a new wing at the museum. An abstract map made up of charcoal, this installation featured all US states and territories, examining legacies of colonialism, indigenous genocide, and slavery.

Also in 2021, Fernández produced a site-specific, permanent sculpture Paradise Parados as part of the Brooklyn Academy of Music (BAM)/ Robert W. Wilson Public Art Initiative. The permanent sculpture was installed in the Robert W. Wilson Sculpture Terrace at BAM Strong, connected to its historic Harvey Theater. Paradise Parados, consisting of 3,000 feet of perforated stainless steel, received the New York City Public Design Commission award for Excellence in Design. The installation echoes the surrounding urban life, presenting a dynamic rethinking of public space.

Fernández has also participated in multiple group shows including Contemporary Optics at the San Francisco Museum of Modern Art (SFMoMA) in 2021 and Forecast Form: Art in the Caribbean Diaspora, 1990s -Today at the Museum of Contemporary Art Chicago (MCA) in 2022.

In the Summer of 2024, SITE Santa Fe presented the exhibition Teresita Fernández / Robert Smithson, which placed Fernández's oeuvre in dialogue with acclaimed Minimalist Robert Smithson’s. Together, the works explore the interstices between place, site, sight, and time through material intelligence, geological agency, and cartographic fiction. The exhibition included over 30 works by Fernández and marked the first time that Smithson’s work has been displayed in conversation with a contemporary living artist.

Fernández is one of the 18 contemporary artists awarded a site-specific commission for the John F. Kennedy International Airport’s new Terminal 6, which is scheduled to open in 2026.

=== Advocacy for the arts ===
Fernández is well known for advocating for Latino artists and in 2016 she partnered with the Ford Foundation to organize the U.S. Latinx Arts Futures Symposium, a landmark gathering of Latino artists with museum directors, curators, scholars, educators, demographers, and funders across the country. Partnering with the Ford Foundation in 2016, Fernández helped found and create the U.S. Latinx Arts Futures Symposium. The symposium was organized to create a dialogue on how to more broadly represent Latino art across the full spectrum of creative disciplines. In her opening address for the U.S. Latinx Arts Futures Symposium, Fernández indicated that the event was meant to create an intersection between "the powerful and the voiceless."

One direct result of the U.S. Latinx Arts Futures Symposium was the Whitney Museum of American Art hire of the museum's first curator specializing in Latino art.

== Awards ==
- 1994: CINTAS Fellowship
- 1995: Metro-Dade Cultural Consortium Grant (Miami, FL)
- 1999: Louis Comfort Tiffany Foundation Biennial Award
- 2003: Guggenheim Fellowship (New York, NY)
- 2005: MacArthur Fellows Program
- 2013: Aspen Art Museum Aspen Award for Art (Aspen, CO)
- 2016: Art in General Visionary Artist Honoree (New York, NY)
- 2017: National Academician, National Academy Museum & School (New York, NY)
- 2017: Mayoral Advisory Commission on City Art, Monuments, and Markers (New York, NY)
- 2017: The Drawing Center 40th Anniversary Honoree (New York, NY)
- 2021: Meridian Cultural Diplomacy Award, Meridian International Center (Washington, D.C.)
- 2021: Award For Excellence in Design, New York City Public Commission (New York, NY)
- 2022: Creative Capital Award (New York, NY)
