= D. S. Lliteras =

American writer

- Born: Daniel Serafin Lliteras; July 13, 1949 (age 77); New York City, U.S.
- Education: Florida State University (BA, MFA)
- Occupation: Author
- Known for: Spiritual novels

Daniel Serafin Lliteras (born July 13, 1949) is an American author best known for his spiritual novels.

== Early life ==
Lliteras was born in the Bronx, New York on July 13, 1949, to Serafin (Frank) and America (Mecca) Lliteras. Originally from Puerto Rico, his father received a bachelor's degree from Emory University (LaGuardia Aeronautical School) in aircraft design in 1959 and worked as a postal clerk for the U.S. Postal Service until his retirement in 1971. His mother, also from Puerto Rico, received her bachelor's degree in nursing from the University of Miami in 1965 and worked for the state of Florida until her retirement in 1991 as the Rehabilitation Nurse Supervisor of Dade and Monroe County, Florida Workers' Compensation.

Lliteras attended St. Athanasius in the South Bronx until 1959 at which time his family relocated to Miami, Florida. His interest in the theater was sparked by Robin Werner, a teacher at Riviera Junior High School, who encouraged him to join the cast of the University of Miami Shakespeare Festival, where he served as a member during the summers of 1964 and 1965. He graduated from Southwest Miami High School in 1967. During his teen years, Lliteras worked evenings as an orderly at Baptist Hospital. His extra-curricular activities included wrestling, track, and gymnastics. He was offered a gymnastics scholarship to the U. S. Merchant Marine Academy, but instead enlisted in the U. S. Navy and volunteered for Medical Service Duty (Hospital Corpsman).

== Vietnam ==
After completing Navy basic training and the U.S. Naval Hospital Corps School in Great Lakes, Illinois, he served aboard the USS Canopus (AS-34), home-ported in Rota, Spain from February 1968 to June 1968. He attended Field Medical Service School in Camp Lejeune, North Carolina in June and July 1968. In May 1969, he was ordered to the First Marine Division, FMF, Vietnam. Upon arrival in Vietnam in July 1969, he volunteered to join the 1st Reconnaissance Battalion, First Marine Division, where he served as a combat corpsman and diver until July 1970. Midway through his tour, he attended diver training in Subic Bay, Philippines. During his tour in Vietnam, Lliteras participated in twenty long-range reconnaissance patrols deep within enemy-held territory. He also participated in eighty combat dives, eighty bridge checks, three river sweeps, five body recoveries, and three weapons recoveries. He was awarded a Bronze Star Medal (with combat “V”).

== Education and employment ==
After his discharge from the Navy, Lliteras attended Florida State University in Tallahassee, Florida on the GI bill, majoring in theater. He received a Bachelor of Arts degree in 1973. Upon being awarded an assistantship at the School of Theater's publicity department, he entered the Masters of Fine Arts program at Florida State University School of Theatre. A member of Phi Kappa Phi honor society, he graduated in 1976 with a Masters of Fine Arts in directing. Afterward, he briefly served on the faculty, where he taught courses in acting, directing, and William Shakespeare's style.

== Theater ==
Among his acting credits while at Florida State, Lliteras's signature achievement was starring in the title role in Lenny Bruce. His directing credits included Small Craft Warnings by Tennessee Williams and Two for the Seesaw by William Gibson. His one-act play Touch won a Christian Theater Artists Guild award and was also produced while at Florida State in 1975. Lliteras also studied mime under Chuck Metcalf, playwrighting under Mark Berman, and directing under Amnon Kabatchnik. Lliteras's professional credits include directing Steambath at the Reunion Theatre in Houston, Texas in 1973 and Henrik Ibsen's Rosmersholm for the New York Theatre Ensemble in 1977.

== Maritime and firefighting ==
In 1979, Lliteras was admitted into the U. S. Merchant Marines' Calhoun MEBA Engineering School in Baltimore, Maryland and subsequently served aboard Edgar M. Queeny. In 1980, he taught at Rutledge College (now University of South Carolina) in Spartanburg, South Carolina, a proprietary business school. In 1981, he received a commission in the U.S. Navy and became a deep sea diving and marine salvage officer. He attended the Naval Diving and Salvage Training Center in Panama City, Florida in September 1981, and later served aboard USS Preserver, sailing from Naval Amphibious Base Little Creek in Virginia. In 1985, he resigned his commission to become a firefighter for the city of Norfolk, graduating academically at the top of his firefighting class in 1986. He received the Medal of Honor from the Norfolk Fire and Paramedical Services in February, 1998 for exceptional action in the line of duty in the saving of life and retired in 2000 after suffering a heart attack on a fire scene.

== Written works ==
Lliteras's Haiku, poetry, and short stories have appeared in many national and international journals and anthologies. His first book publication, In a Warrior’s Romance (1991), includes Haiku and photographs reflecting his experiences in Vietnam. A source of its originality stems from it being the first major application of Haiku to the subject of war. His first three novels, collectively known as the Llewellen Trilogy, trace the spiritual journey of Robert Llewellen, a man who learns how to escape, not from life, but into life. The trilogy includes In the Heart of Things (1992), Into the Ashes (1993), and Half Hidden by Twilight (1994). In his novel 613 West Jefferson (2001), Lliteras revisited the theme of Vietnam through the character of Richard Santos, a returning veteran who encounters fringe elements of the counter-culture in a north Florida town.

Lliteras is best known for his biblical novels, which include The Thieves of Golgotha (1998), Judas the Gentile (1999), Jerusalem’s Rain (2003), The Silence of John (2005), and The Master of Secrets (2007).

A book about his firefighting experiences, Flames and Smoke Visible: A Fire Fighter’s Tale, was published in 2012.

In 2015, his novel entitled Viet Man was published.

== Personal life ==
In 1971, Lliteras married Kathleen Touchstone, a retired educator and author of numerous scholarly works. She dedicated her book, Then Athena Said: Unilateral Transfers and the Transformation of Objectivist Ethics, to her husband.

== Publications ==
=== Books ===
- In a Warrior’s Romance (1991) Hampton Roads Publishing Co., Inc., poetry-photography, trade paper ISBN 1878901052
- In the Heart of Things (1992) Hampton Roads Publishing Co., Inc., fiction, trade paper
- In the Heart of Things (2006) (Russian) Moscow, Russia: Gayatri Publishing, fiction, trade paper
- Into the Ashes (1993) Hampton Roads Publishing Co., Inc., fiction, trade paper
- Half Hidden by Twilight (1994) Hampton Roads Publishing Co., Inc., fiction, trade paper (Kindle, Nook)
- The Thieves of Golgotha (1998) Hampton Roads Publishing Co., Inc., fiction, hard cover (Nook)
- Judas the Gentile (1999) Hampton Roads Publishing Co., Inc., fiction, hard cover (Kindle, Nook)
- Judas (2001) (Italian) São Paulo Edizioni, Italy, fiction, trade paper
- 613 West Jefferson (2001) Hampton Roads Publishing Co., Inc., fiction, hard cover (Kindle, Nook)
- Jerusalem’s Rain (2003) Hampton Roads Publishing Co., Inc., fiction, hard cover (Kindle, Nook) ISBN 1571743405
- The Silence of John (2005) Hampton Roads Publishing Co., Inc., fiction, hard cover ISBN 157174410X
- Master of Secrets (2007) Hampton Roads Publishing Co., Inc., fiction, hard cover ISBN 1571745386
- Flames and Smoke Visible: A Fire Fighter’s Tale (2012) Rainbow Ridge Books, nonfiction, hard cover (Kindle) ISBN 1937907090
- Viet Man (2015) Rainbow Ridge Books, novel ISBN 9781937907327
- Syllables of Rain (2017) Rainbow Ridge Books, novel ISBN 193790752X

=== Selected poetry periodicals ===
- Backyard Bamboo (East Detroit, MI) No. 2
- Bent Nails (Ottawa, Ontario, Canada) Vol. VI, No. 2
- Brussels Sprout (Mercer Island, WA) Vo. VI, No. 3
- Canopy (Bareilly, India)(1991) Jan-Mar, Vol. VI, Nos. 1 &2
- Cicada (Bakersfield, CA) (1988) Vol. IV, No. 1; (1991) Vol. V, Numbers 3 and 4; (1992) Vol. VI, No. 1; (1994) Vo. VI, No. 3: (1995) Vol. VI, No. 4
- Frogpond (Haiku Society of America, New York, NY) (1989) Nov, Vol. XII, No. 4; (1990) Nov, Vol. XIII, No. 4; (1991) Spring, Vol. XIV, No. 1; (1993) Summer, Vol. XVI, No. 1
- Haiku Headlines (Los Angeles, CA) (1990) Mar, Vol. 2, No. 12; (1990) Nov, Vol. 3, No. 8; (1993) Mar, Vol. 5, No. 12; (1993), Apr, Vol. 6, No. 1; (1993) May, Vol. 6, No. 2; (1993) Aug, Vol. 6, No. 5 (1993) Sep Vol. 6, No. 6; (1993) Oct, Vol. 6, No. 7
- Haiku Quarterly (Mesa, AZ) (1989) Winter, Vol. 1, No.4; (1989) Spring, Vo. 1, No. 1; (1989) Autumn, Vol., 1, No. 3; (1990/91) Winter Vol. 2, No. 4
- Haiku Zasshi Zo (Seattle, WA) (1988) Summer/Fall; (1989) HZZ Anthology
- Hobo Stew Review (Allston, MA) (1988) Fall
- Hummingbird (Richland Center, WI) (1993) Mar, Vol. III, No. 2; (1993) Sep, Vol. IV, No. 1; (1994) Dec, Vol. V, No. 2
- The Indian Writer (Madras, India) (1989)
- Jam To-day (Tyngsboro, MA) (1988) Issue 14, (1990) Issue 15
- Japanophile (Okemos, MI) (1995) Summer, Vol. 19, No.3
- Ko: Haiku Magazine in English (Nagoya, Japan) (1990) Spring/Summer; (1991) Autumn/Winter; (1992) Autumn/Winter
- Kumquat Meringue (Pine Island, MN) (2001) Issue No. 6
- Kusamakura Haiku Collection Book (Kumamoto, Japan) (1999) January, Nyuusen (Third Prize)
- Kusamakura Haiku Collection Book (Kumamoto, Japan) (2003) January, Nyuusen (Third Prize)
- Mainichi Daily News (Haiku in English) (1988) Mar 6; (1988) Jul 10; (1988) Sep 18; (1988) Dec. 11; (1989) May 28; (1990) Nov 12; (1991) Apr 27; (1993) Apr 3
- Mainichi Haiku Contest (Tokyo, Japan) (1998–99) International Section: Honorable Mention in English
- Mirrors (Gualala, CA) (1990) Winter; (1990) Spring; (1990) Summer; (1990) Autumn; (1993) Winter; (1993) Summer; (1994) Winter; (1994) Summer
- Modern Haiku (Madison, WI) (1989) Summer, Vol. XX, No. 2; (1989) Autumn, Vol. XX, No. 3; (1990) Winter/Spring, Vol. XXI, No. 1; (1991) Fall; Vol. XXII, No. 3
- The New American Association of Haikuists Newsletter (Jackson, TN) (1989) Sep
- New Cicada (Fukushima, Japan) (1988) Winter, Vol. 5, No. 2; (1988) Summer, Vol. 5, No. 1; (1989) Winter, Vol. 6, No. 2; (1990) Winter, Vol. 7, No. 2; (1990) Summer, Vo. 7, No. 1; (1992) Winter, Vol. 9, No. 2; (1993) Summer, Vol. 10, No. 1; (1997) Summer, Vol. 10, No. 2
- The North Carolina Haiku Press (Raleigh, NC) (1990) Holiday Haiku Chapbook
- Parnassus Literary Journal (Forest Park, GA) (1990) Fall/Winter, Vol. 14, No. 3; (1990) Summer, Vol. 14, No. 2
- Piedmont Literary Review (Forest, VA) (1991) Vol. XV, No. 1
- The Plover: Chidori (Okinawa, Japan) (1989) No. 1; (1990) No. 2
- Poetry Nippon (Nagoya, Japan) (1988) No. 83, Special Summer Issue, Vol. IX, No. 3; (1989) No. 87 Special Summer Issue, Vol. IX, No. 7; (1990) No. 91, Special Summer Issue, Vol. X, No. 1; (1991) No. 95, Special Summer Issue, Vol. X, No. 5
- The Poet's Domain (Charlottesville, VA) Livewire Press, Vols. 16, 17, 18, 19, 20, 21, 22
- Rachna (Bihar, India) (1990) Winter
- The Red Pagoda (Jackson, TN) Vol. V, No. 3
- Skylark (Aligarh, India) Issue 72
- South by Southeast (Archer, FL) (1994) Newsletter of the Southeastern Region Haiku Society of America Feb, Vol. 1, No. 1
- South by Southeast (Richmond, VA) Vol. 6, No. 2; Vol. 7, No. 1
- Wide Open Magazine (Eureka, CA) (1988) Winter, Vol. IV, No. 3; (1988) Spring, Vo. IV, No. 4; (1988) Summer, Vo. V, No. 1; (1988) Fall, Vol. V, No. II, (1989) Winter, Vol. V, No. III; (1989) Spring, Vol. V, No. IV; (1989) Summer, Vol. VI, No. I; (1989) Fall, Vol. VI, No. II; (1990) Winter, Vol. VI, No. III
- Wind Chimes (Glen Burnie, MD), Issue 21; Issue 28

=== Poetry anthologies ===
- Four Seasons (1991), Ko Poetry Association, Japan
- How to Haiku, A Writer's Guide to Haiku and Related Forms (2002), Bruce Ross, ed. Tuttle Publishing, p. 63
- Journey to the Interior: American Versions of Haibun (1998), Bruce Ross, ed. Tuttle Publishing, p. 142
- Wind Five Folded, An Anthology of English Language (1994), AHA Books, p. 13
- World Poetry 1991 Best Poems by 342 Eminent Poets in 70 Countries, (Madras, India), p. 30

=== Short story anthologies and periodicals ===
- Chiron Review (1995) Autumn/Winter, Issue 44-45 “Hill 452”
- Happy 10, The Happy Organization Publisher, New York (1998) “Under the Rain”
- In Good Company, Live Wire Press (1999) “The Cleansing Ritual”; (2000) “Big Cities Have Many Colors” (2001) “Turning Things Off”; (2002) “An Abstract Heretic”; (2005) “In a Dream”; (2008) “The Theatre”; (2009) “The Left Ascension” and “Monkey Man”; (2010) “The Horseshoe Crab”
- Ruehlmann, Bill (2001). “As This Book Tells All of Us, We’re a Collection of Stories [In Good Company (2000)]” The Virginian-Pilot, Aug. 26.
- Vietnam War Generation Journal (2001) Dec, Vol. 1, No. 3 “Half Brothers”
- Vietnam War Generation Journal (2002) Dec, Vol. 2, No. 2 “Angels in Repose: Chapter 1-Chapter 7”
- Vietnam War Generation Journal (2003) Apr, Vol. 2, No. 3-4 “Angels in Repose: Chapter 8-Chapter 9”
