= Melanie Thernstrom =

American writer

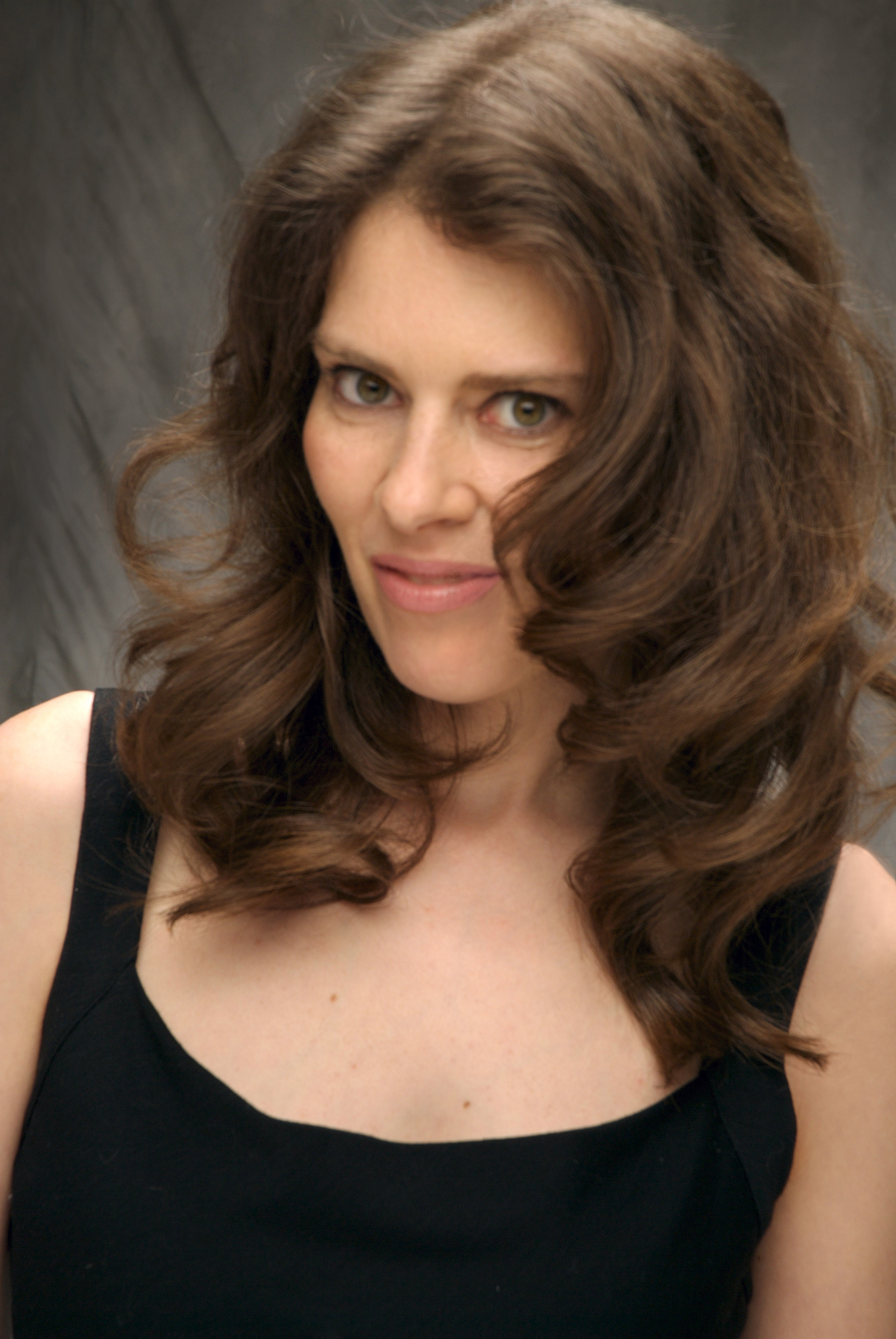
- Born: June 30, 1964 (age 62)
- Education: Harvard University; Cornell University (MFA)
- Occupations: Author; writer
- Children: 2
- Parent(s): Stephan Thernstrom; Abigail Thernstrom

Melanie Thernstrom (born June 30, 1964) is an American author and contributing writer for The New York Times Magazine who frequently writes about murders and crime.

== Biography ==
Thernstrom attended Harvard University, where she graduated with highest honors in English. She received an MFA in creative writing at Cornell and taught creative writing at Cornell, Harvard, and in the MFA program at the University of California, Irvine.

== Books ==
Thernstrom's senior thesis was entitled Mistakes of Metaphor, an account of the mysterious disappearance and murder of her best friend, Bibi Lee, three years earlier, for which Lee’s boyfriend was eventually convicted on the basis of a confession which he recanted. Thernstrom's poetry professor showed the thesis to literary agents, and she soon received an advance of $367,000. The Dead Girl, which was published by Pocket Books in 1990, was praised by literary critics such as Harold Bloom, Harold Brodkey and Helen Vendler as reimagining the true crime genre with its use of literary theory and reflections on memory and metaphor.

Thernstrom's second book, Halfway Heaven: Diary of a Harvard Murder, was about Sinedu Tadesse, a Harvard junior from Ethiopia who murdered her Vietnamese roommate and then committed suicide while living at Dunster House in 1995. In contrast to The Dead Girl, Halfway Heaven explores murder from the point of view of the murderer. Thernstrom had met Tadesse while teaching an autobiographical writing course at Harvard. After her death, Thernstrom reported on it for The New Yorker, traveling to Ethiopia and obtaining access to Tadesse's diaries which described her struggles against growing mental illness and her failed attempts to get help from the University. Halfway Heaven was praised by Mikal Gilmore and Elaine Showalter.

In 1999, Thernstrom wrote a lengthy Vanity Fair article on murdered college student Matthew Shepard. Her pieces in the New York Times Magazine have included ones on the Lord's Resistance Army in Northern Uganda, narrative medicine, physical pain, high-end matchmakers, divorce, fugitives, and a personal essay on losing an art inheritance. Her work has also appeared in New York magazine, The Wall Street Journal, Food & Wine, Travel + Leisure, Elle, and other publications. Her food essays have appeared in Best American Food Writing 2001 and 2004.

== Personal life ==
Thernstrom is the daughter of Abigail Thernstrom, who was a prominent political scientist, and Stephan Thernstrom, the Winthrop Professor of American History Emeritus at Harvard. She lives with her husband and two children in Palo Alto, California.
