= Jeff Urgelles =

Jeffrey Urgelles (born June 19, 1982 in Miami, Florida) is the former bullpen coordinator for the Miami Marlins.

== Life ==
Urgelles graduated from Southwest Miami High School, and from Broward Community College with an AA in Liberal Arts, where he was 2nd-Team All-Conference. He transferred to Savannah State University and was a First-Team All-Conference selection. He was a firefighter-paramedic for Miami-Dade County, Florida. He is married.

== Playing career ==
Urgelles batted Right, and threw Right; his height is 6' 1"; his weight is 200 lb. He was a 26th round selection of the Cincinnati Reds in 2003, and spent three seasons in the Reds system before ending his career in the Blue Jays' organization. He had a .235 career average with eight home runs and 82 RBI in 192 games. In his first professional season, he led the Gulf Coast League in doubles (20), and ranked third in extra-base hits (22). He posted a 5 for 5 game with five doubles, three runs scored and three RBIs on July 17, 2003 at the Gulf Coast League Twins.
