= Murder of Trang Phuong Ho =

1995 murder-suicide at Harvard University

- Trang Ho
- Location: Dunster House at Harvard University in Cambridge, Massachusetts, US
- Date: May 28, 1995; 31 years ago
- Target: Trang Phuong Ho
- Attack type: Stabbing, suicide by hanging
- Deaths: 2 (including the perpetrator)
- Injuries: 1
- Victims: Trang Phuong Ho and Thao Nguyen
- Perpetrator: Sinedu Tadesse

Sinedu Tadesse

On May 28, 1995, Harvard College junior Trang Phuong Ho was fatally stabbed by her roommate, fellow junior Sinedu Tadesse, in their shared suite in Dunster House. After also attacking and injuring Ho's friend Thao Nguyen, Tadesse hanged herself in the suite bathroom. The attack attracted sustained national coverage and focused attention on Harvard's handling of student mental health and residential life.

== Background ==
=== Trang Phuong Ho ===
Trang Phuong Ho (Vietnamese: Hồ Phương Trang; 1974 – May 28, 1995) was born in Ho Chi Minh City, Vietnam, and came to the United States as a boat refugee with her father and older sister in November 1985; her mother and younger sister joined them in 1990. The family settled in Dorchester, Boston, and Ho attended local public schools. Shortly after the arrival of her mother and sister, Ho's parents separated. Her father moved to San Diego after her mother accused him of abuse, and Trang became the de facto head of household.

Trang was known for her excitement about learning. She was named one of "25 Who Can Save Boston" by Boston Magazine while still in high school. She entered Harvard College in 1992 on full financial aid, concentrated in biology, and hoped to become a doctor. Ho lived with her mother and sisters in Medford, Massachusetts, worked at the Dunster House library and at the Dana–Farber Cancer Institute, and was a vice president of the Harvard Vietnamese Association.

=== Sinedu Tadesse ===
Sinedu Tadesse (September 25, 1975 – May 28, 1995) was born in Addis Ababa, Ethiopia, into a middle-class family during the Ethiopian Red Terror. Her father, a government school administrator, was imprisoned for two years without trial when Tadesse was seven. Tadesse devoted herself to her studies, gaining admission to the International Community School, where she graduated as valedictorian and was admitted to Harvard.

At Harvard, Tadesse maintained grades around a B average and remained socially isolated, even from relatives who lived nearby. It was later discovered that Tadesse had sent letters to dozens of strangers, whose names she had picked from the phone book, describing her unhappiness and pleading with them to be her friend.

=== Roommate relationship ===
In the spring of her first year, Tadesse's initial roommate chose to live with someone else. Tadesse met Ho in a science class, and they agreed to share a suite. Friends and relatives described Ho as studious and well-liked, while Tadesse relied on her heavily for companionship. In Tadesse's diary, she recounted her joy about the friendship, writing that she would make Ho the "queen of my life".

Tadesse became angry when Ho began to distance herself in their junior year. By the spring of 1995, Ho had arranged to live with a different group of students in their senior year, and communication between the roommates largely ceased.

== Homicide ==
On the morning of May 28, 1995, near the end of exam period, Ho and Tadesse were in the adjoining bedrooms in their two-room Dunster House suite. Ho's best friend, Thao Nguyen, was staying overnight to help Ho move out for the summer. Around 8:00 a.m., Tadesse used a buck knife to stab Ho 45 times while Ho was in bed.

Nguyen awoke and was also attacked and stabbed but managed to escape the suite, seek help from other residents, and survive her injuries. Responding students and campus police found Ho dead in the suite and discovered that Tadesse had barricaded herself in the suite, where she died by hanging in the bathroom.

== Investigation and aftermath ==
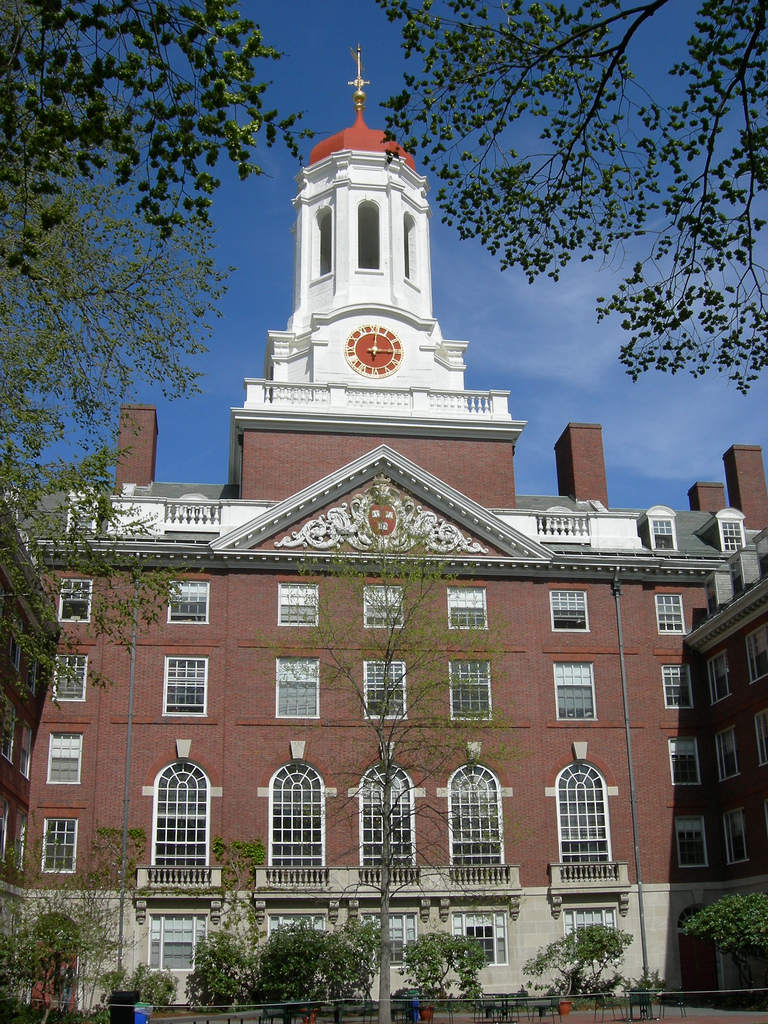
Dunster House in 2006

Cambridge and Harvard police and the Middlesex County district attorney's office investigated the killings and quickly concluded that Tadesse had killed Ho, injured Nguyen, and then taken her own life; no other suspects were identified. Investigators recovered Tadesse's diaries, which chronicled years of social isolation, despair, and violent fantasies, and noted that she had recently missed several exams and clinical appointments.

Days before the killings, an envelope containing a photograph of Tadesse and a typewritten note promising a "very juicy story" had been mailed anonymously to The Harvard Crimson. Though it had been discarded, it was retrieved from a trash can in the newspaper's offices after the murders. Reporting in the months that followed highlighted Tadesse's treatment at Harvard University Health Services, the letters she sent to strangers seeking friendship, and the absence of a coordinated institutional response to her deteriorating mental state.

== Legal proceedings ==
In February 1998, Ho's family filed a wrongful death lawsuit in Middlesex County Superior Court against Harvard University and several Dunster House administrators, alleging negligence and seeking damages for "wrongful death, conscious pain and suffering and emotional distress". The complaint asserted that the university and its employees had sufficient information about Tadesse's severe psychological distress and risk of violence that they should have acted to protect Ho and other students.

Harvard denied legal responsibility in court filings, arguing that it could not reasonably have foreseen or prevented the killings and that it owed no specific duty under Massachusetts law to protect Ho from her roommate. The case was settled out of court in 1998.

Commentators and later reporting noted that, in the years after the murders, Harvard expanded its counseling staff, created mental-health liaison roles in the undergraduate Houses, and restructured parts of its health services, changes that administrators and observers linked in part to scrutiny triggered by the Dunster House killings and the Ho family lawsuit.

== Legacy ==
In 1997, Melanie Thernstrom, who graduated from Harvard in 1987 and taught creative writing at the college, published a book about the case and its aftermath. It was sharply critical of how Harvard handled the crime. She also detailed several instances of Harvard students with mental health issues whose situations were exacerbated by unsympathetic university officials and ineffective advisors. Thernstrom traveled to Tadesse's home in Ethiopia and gained access to her diaries, which revealed her deteriorating mental health, obsessive fantasizing about an ideal friend, and attempts to find effective psychiatric care.
