= Strong Women Strong Girls =

Mentoring organization for girls

Strong Women Strong Girls (SWSG) is a mentoring organization for girls in grades 3–5 with a focus on female empowerment and healthy habits and with the goal of helping them to develop skills for lifelong success. The program was started by Lindsay Hyde while she was a high school senior in Miami, Florida and in 2000 when she moved to college, she expanded the program to be a student group at Harvard University. The mentoring began with six college-age women serving as mentors in two elementary schools.

The program expanded throughout the greater Boston, Massachusetts area and in 2004 was incorporated as a non-profit organization with Hyde as the organization's executive director. In 2006, SWSG launched programming in its first expansion community of Pittsburgh, Pennsylvania and a Miami initiative followed in 2009.

Jocelyn Horner was named CEO in 2017.
