= Abigail Thernstrom =

American political scientist (1936–2020)

Abigail Thernstrom (September 14, 1936 – April 10, 2020) was an American political scientist and a leading conservative scholar on race relations, voting rights and education. She was an adjunct scholar at the American Enterprise Institute, a Senior Fellow at the Manhattan Institute, a member of the Massachusetts Board of Education, and vice chair of the United States Commission on Civil Rights. She received her Ph.D. from the Department of Government at Harvard University in 1975. According to The New York Times, she and her husband, Harvard Professor Stephan Thernstrom, were "much in demand on the conservative talk-show circuit, where they forcefully argue that racial preferences are wrong, divisive, and as a tool to help minorities overrated. They serve on the boards of conservative and libertarian public-policy institutes."

== Biography ==
Abigail Mann was born on September 14, 1936, in New York City. Raised on a collective farm in Croton-on-Hudson, New York, by radical secular Jewish parents, she was originally active in progressive politics and became politically conservative in middle age, supporting a color-blind philosophy and taking steps to provide equal opportunity through improving education while becoming increasingly critical of affirmative action, gerrymandering, and identity politics.

After graduating from the progressive Little Red School House and Elisabeth Irwin High School in Greenwich Village, she attended Reed College in Oregon before transferring to Barnard College in New York and graduated with the class of 1958.

Thernstrom and her husband, Harvard historian Stephan Thernstrom, co-authored the book America in Black and White: One Nation, Indivisible, a history of race relations which The New York Times Book Review named as one of the notable books of 1997. She and her husband also co-authored No Excuses: Closing the Racial Gap in Learning (Simon and Schuster, October 2003), named by both the Los Angeles Times and the American School Board Journal as one of the best books of 2003 and the winner of the 2007 Fordham Prize for Distinguished Scholarship. In 2007, she and her husband were the recipients of a Bradley Foundation prize for Outstanding Intellectual Achievement. She served on several boards, including the Center for Equal Opportunity and the Institute for Justice. From 1992-97 she was a member of the Aspen Institute's Domestic Strategy Group.

Thernstrom's first book, Whose Votes Count? Affirmative Action and Minority Voting Rights, won four awards, including the American Bar Association's Certificate of Merit, and the Anisfield-Wolf prize for the best book on race and ethnicity and the Benchmark Book Award from the Center for Judicial Studies. Along with her husband, she also won the 2004 Peter Shaw Memorial Award given by the National Association of Scholars.

She wrote for The Economist, The Wall Street Journal, the Los Angeles Times, The New York Times and the (London) Times Literary Supplement. She often spoke to the media about voting rights, education, and other issues and appeared on Good Morning America, Fox News Sunday, and This Week with George Stephanopoulos, among other places.

Because of their differing opinions on civil rights, President Bill Clinton chose her as one of three authors to participate in his first "town meeting" on race in Akron, Ohio, on December 3, 1997. She was part of a small group that met with the President again in the Oval Office on December 19, 1997.

As vice-chair of the Civil Rights Commission, she rebutted other conservatives who disputed the dropping of voter intimidation charges against a duo from the New Black Panther Party. In an interview with CBS News, Thernstrom said that she believed "the evidence is extremely weak" that the Department of Justice has discriminated against white voters. Thernstrom explained her opinion on the case in an article for National Review, in which she refers to the New Black Panther Party case as "very small potatoes". About Barack Obama-appointee Eric Holder, she stated, "There are plenty of grounds on which to sharply criticize the attorney general – his handling of terrorism questions, just for starters – but this particular overblown attack threatens to undermine the credibility of his conservative critics."

Her daughter is the writer Melanie Thernstrom. Her son is Samuel Thernstrom, founder of the Energy Innovation Reform Project (EIRP), a nonprofit organization that promotes the development of advanced energy technologies.

Shortly after testing negative for COVID-19, she died April 10, 2020, in Arlington, Virginia. She was 83 years old.

== Awards ==
- 1988, Anisfield-Wolf Book Award, Whose Votes Count?: Affirmative Action and Minority Voting Rights
