= Dunster House =

Residential house of Harvard College

- Harvard University
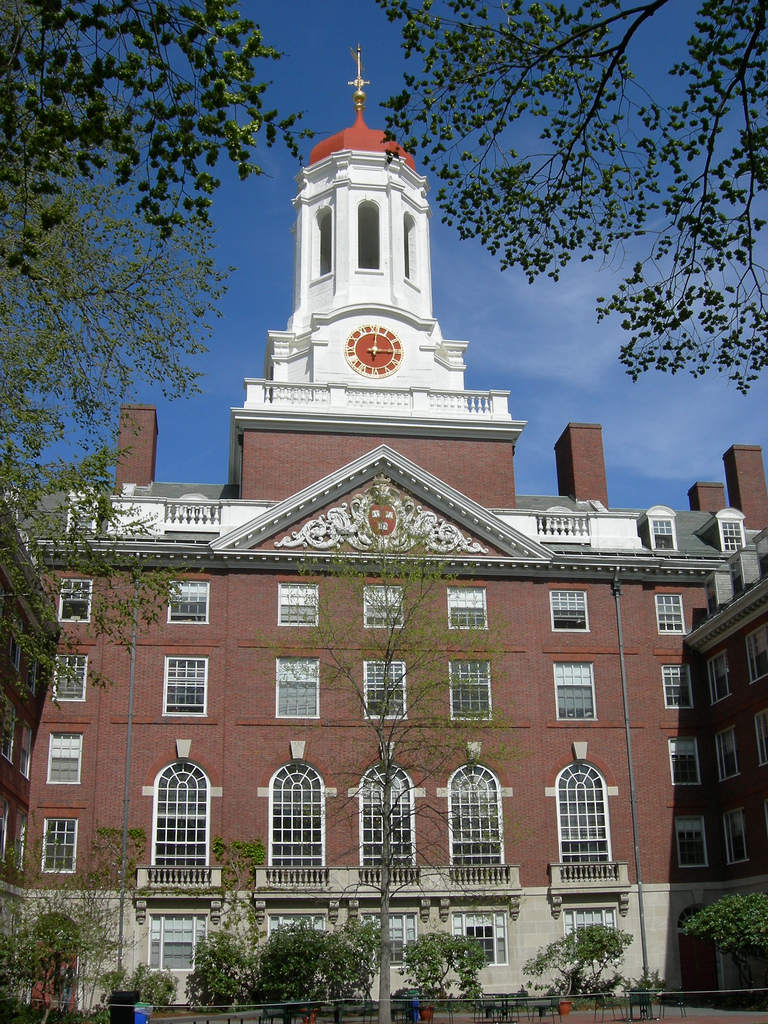
- The central tower of Dunster House

- Shield
- Location: 945 Memorial Drive
- Coordinates: 42°22′07″N 71°06′58″W
- Full name: Henry Dunster House
- Established: 1930
- Named for: Henry Dunster
- Sister college: Berkeley College
- Faculty Deans: Taeku and Shirley Lee
- Dean: Gregory Davis
- HoCo chairs: Ellie Cassidy and Spencer Lee
- Tutors: 19
- Website: dunster.harvard.edu

Dunster House is one of 12 undergraduate residential houses at Harvard University. Built in 1930, it is one of the first two Harvard dormitories constructed under President Abbott Lawrence Lowell's House Plan and one of the seven Houses given to Harvard by Edward Harkness. In the early days, room rents varied based on the floor and the size of the room. Dunster was unique among Harvard dormitories for its sixth-story walk-up (it had no elevators); these rooms were originally rented by poorer students, such as Norman Mailer.

The House was named in honor of Henry Dunster, Harvard's first president.

== History ==
Dunster House's tower is inspired by, but somewhat smaller than, Tom Tower of Christ Church, Oxford. Above the east wing is the Dunster family coat of arms, and above the west wing is the coat of arms of Magdalene College, Cambridge, where Henry Dunster matriculated in 1627. Magdalene College commemorated the relationship between the two universities by sending medieval tracery stones from the First Court of Magdalene; these are now set in the wall near the doors to J-entry of Dunster House.

Dunster is on the banks of the Charles River next to the John W. Weeks Footbridge, which links Harvard's Allston and Cambridge campuses. From above, its architectural shape, unusual among the River Houses, resembles a branching flowchart due to the odd trapezoidal footprint of the land on which it was built. Dunster underwent a "full House renewal", a comprehensive renovation, that was completed in 2016. It was the first of Harvard's residential houses to undergo such a renewal.

Like many of Harvard's Houses, Dunster has many yearly traditions, including Keg Races in the fall, a Messiah singalong in the winter, a Goat Roast in the spring, and the yearly Dunster House Opera. It is known as one of the more social houses, with Stein Clubs and formals in either the dining hall or courtyard.

Dunster's Faculty Deans (formerly known as "house masters") are Taeku and Shirley Lee. The House's first master was Chester N. Greenough (Harvard class of 1898), an English professor and former dean of Harvard College. Former faculty deans/house masters include Sean Kelly and Cheryl Chen, Roger Porter and Ann Porter, Raoul Bott, and Sally Falk Moore and Cresap Moore. Gregory Davis currently serves as the Allston Burr Resident Dean.

Dunster's mascot is the moose, inspired by the three golden elk on the Dunster family crest.

== Physical building ==
Dunster House opened in 1930, and contains student rooms, a faculty dean residence, and a dining hall with views of the Charles River.

== List of housemaster(s) / faculty dean(s) ==
Name(s)	Years of tenure
1930–1934	Chester N. Greenough
1934–1948	Clarence H. Haring
1948–1962	Gordon M. Fair
1962–1970	Alwin Max Pappenheimer Jr.
1970–1973	Roger Rosenblatt
1973–1978	James Vorenberg & Elizabeth Vorenberg
1978–1984	Raoul Bott
1984–1989	Sally Falk Moore & Cresap Moore
1989–2001	Karel F. Liem & Ann Liem
2001–2017	Roger B. Porter & Ann R. Porter
2017–2025	Sean Kelly & Cheryl Chen
2025–present	Taeku Lee & Shirley Lee

== Notable alumni ==
Al Gore

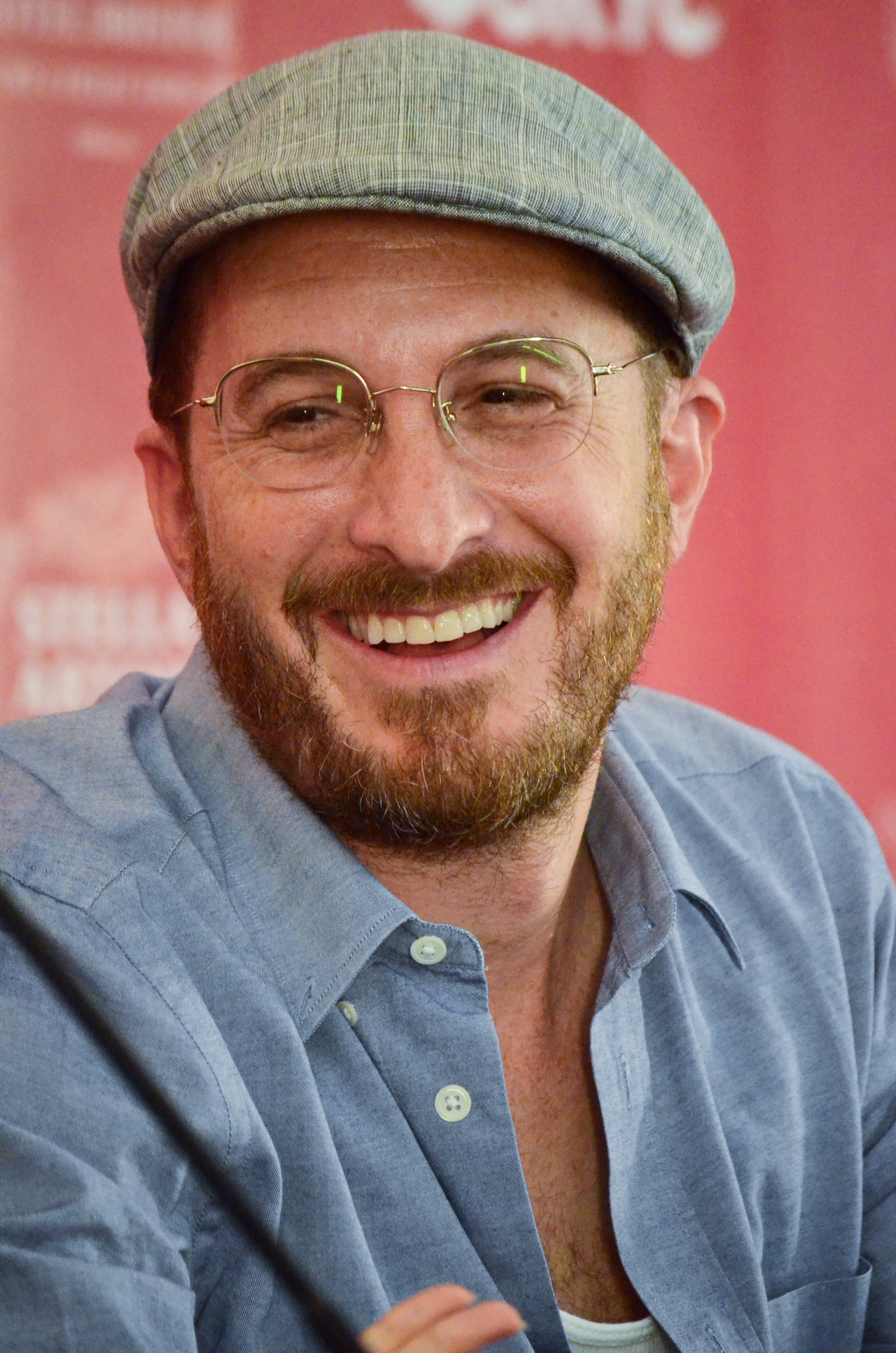
Darren Aronofsky

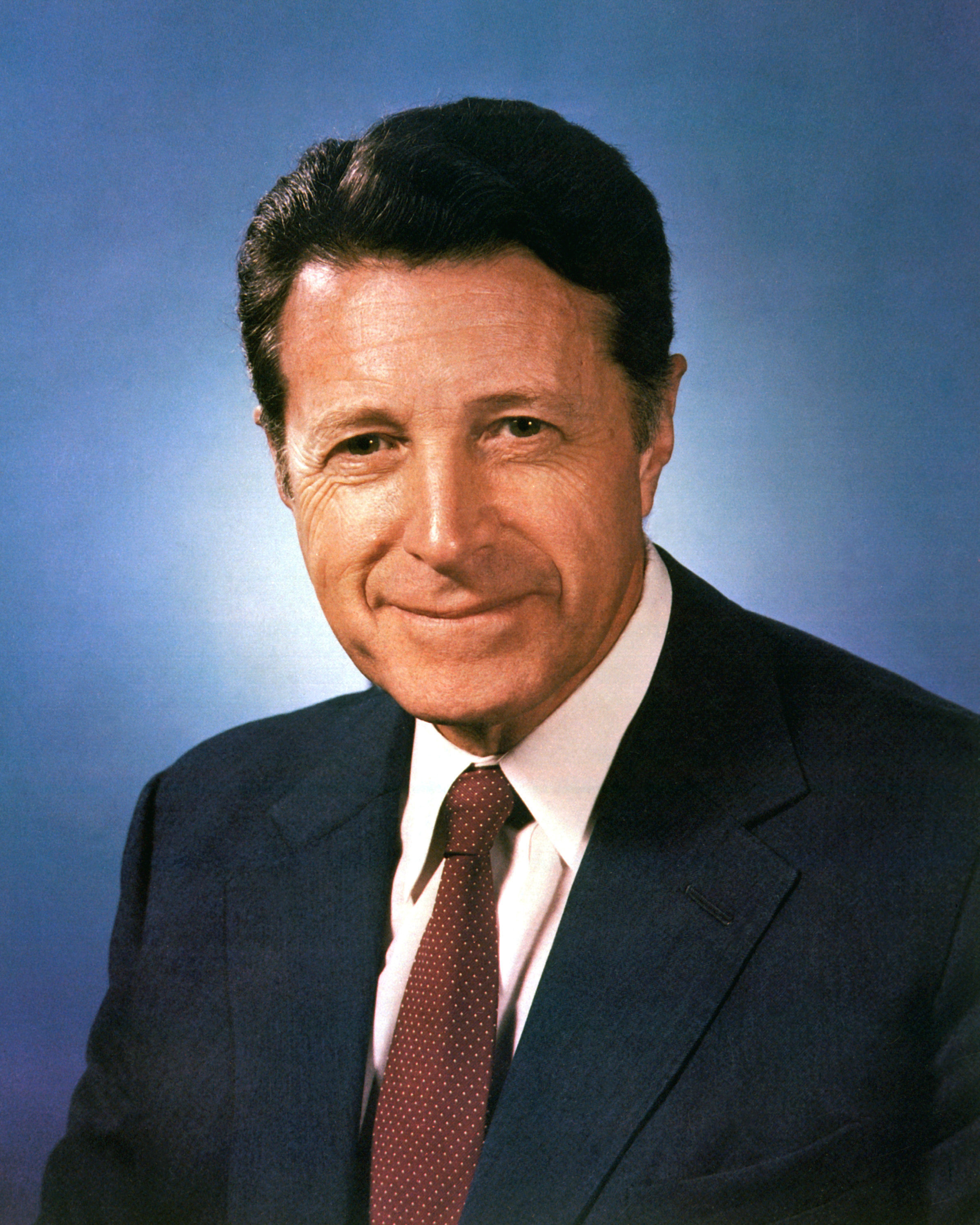
Caspar Weinberger

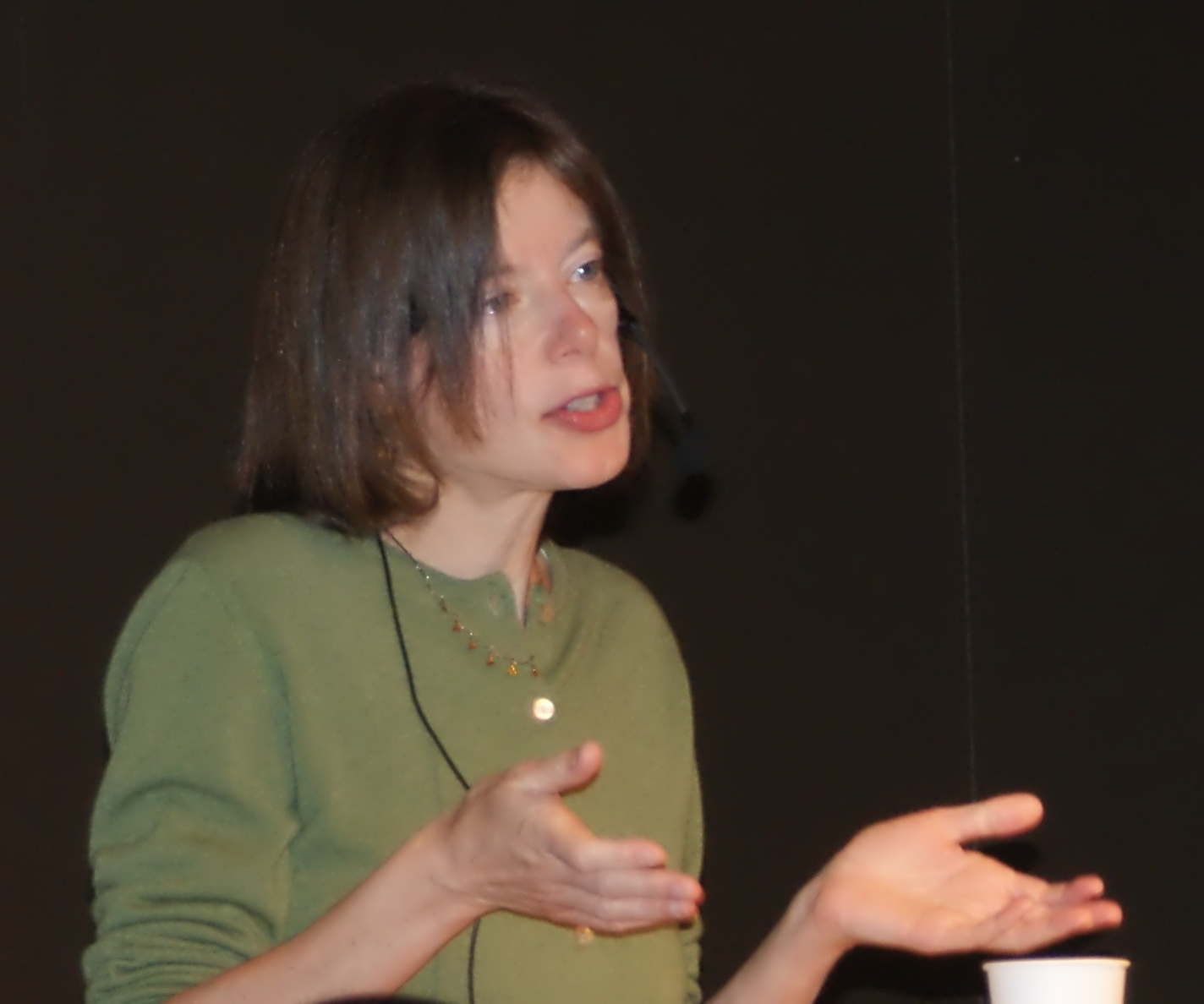
Susan Faludi

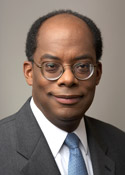
Roger Ferguson

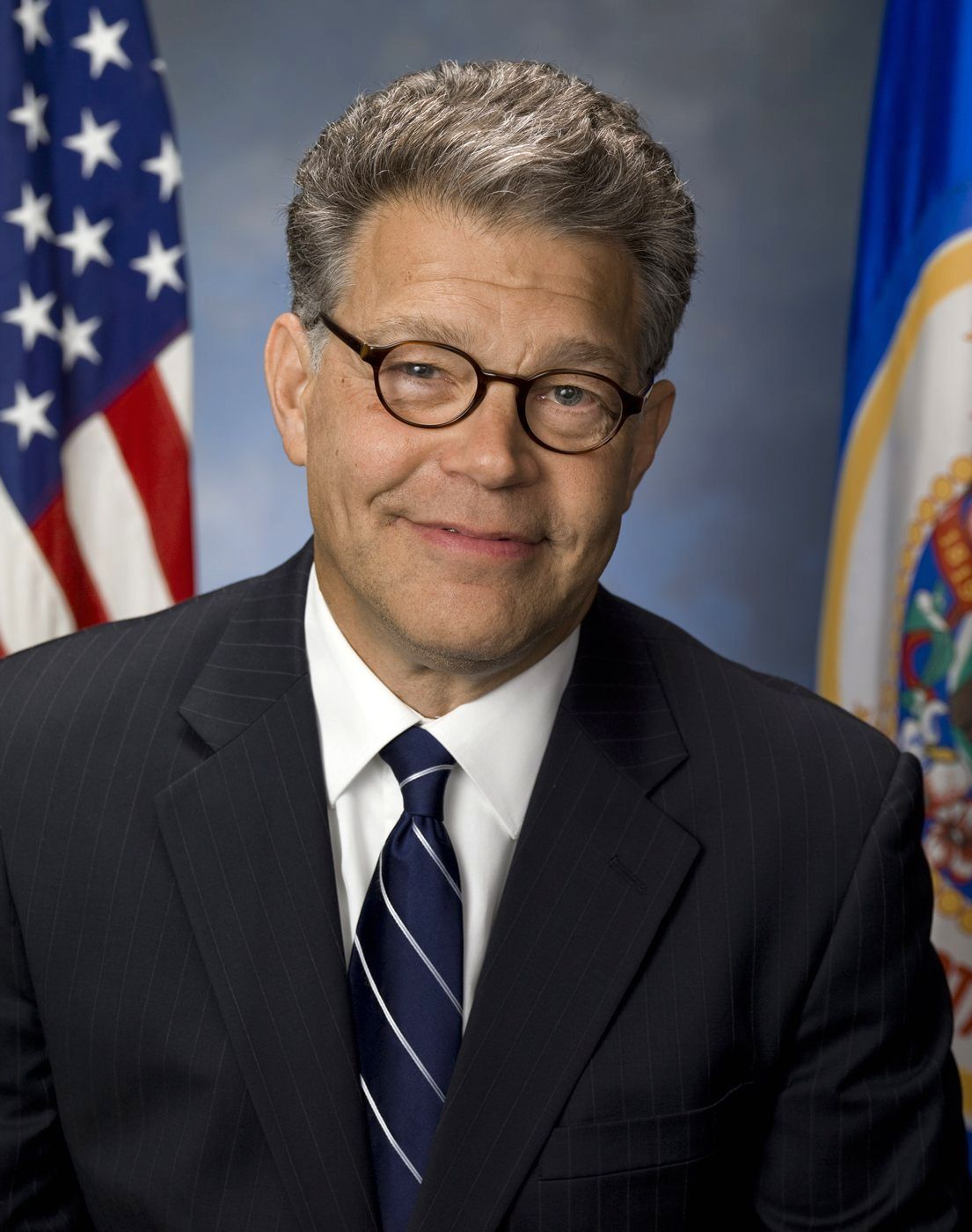
Al Franken

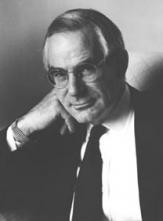
David Halberstam

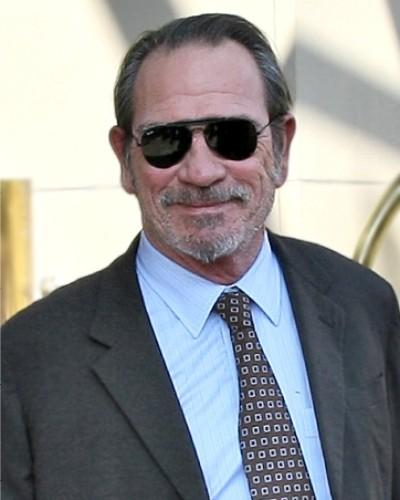
Tommy Lee Jones

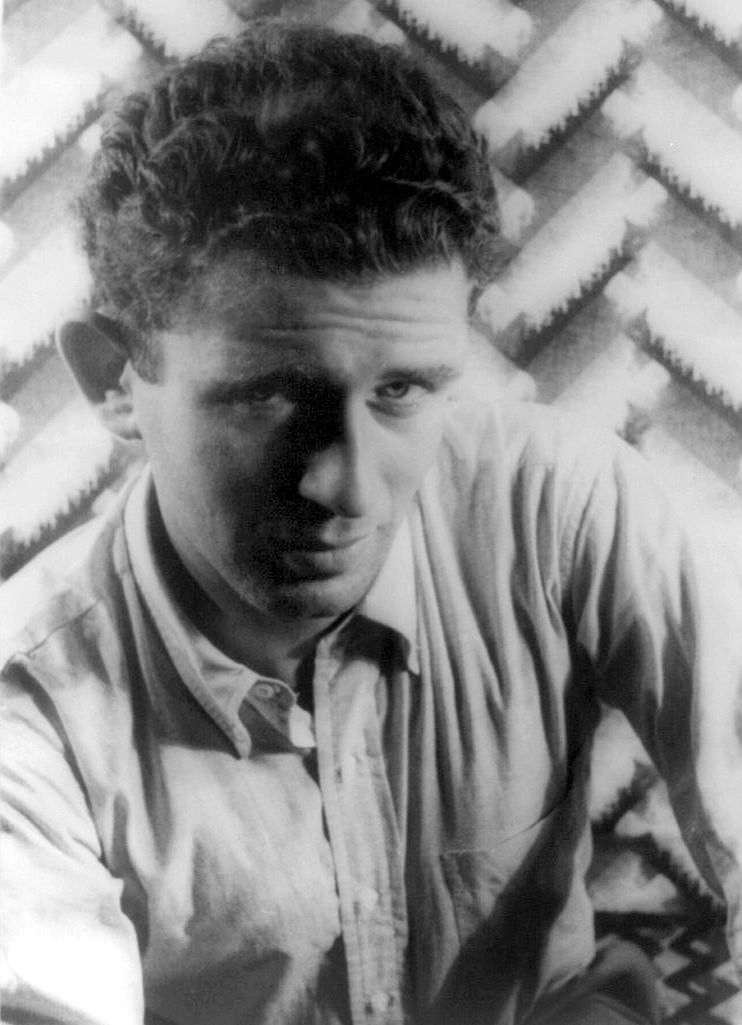
Norman Mailer

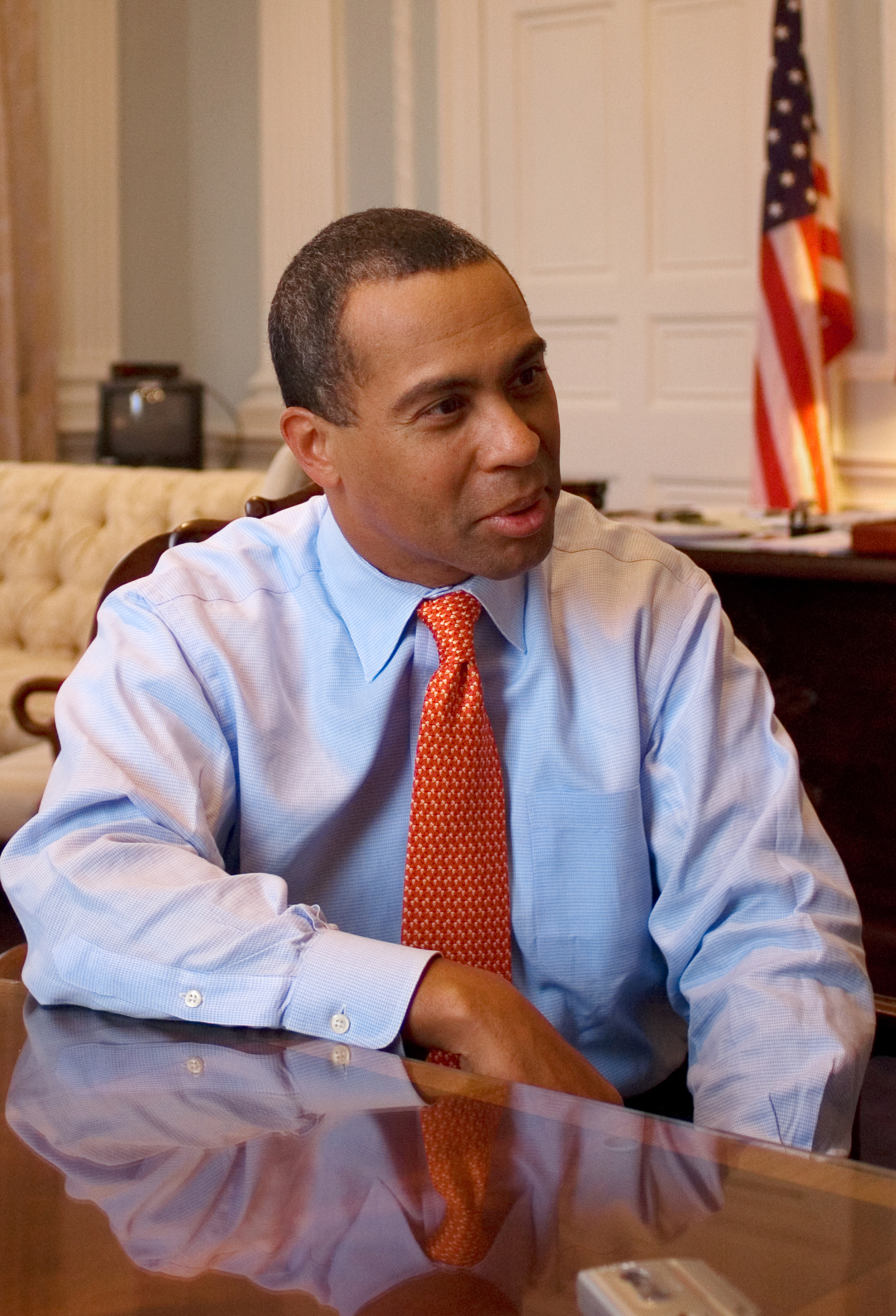
Deval Patrick

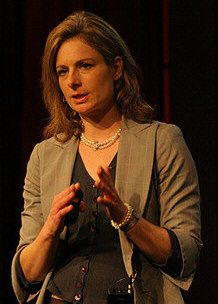
Lisa Randall

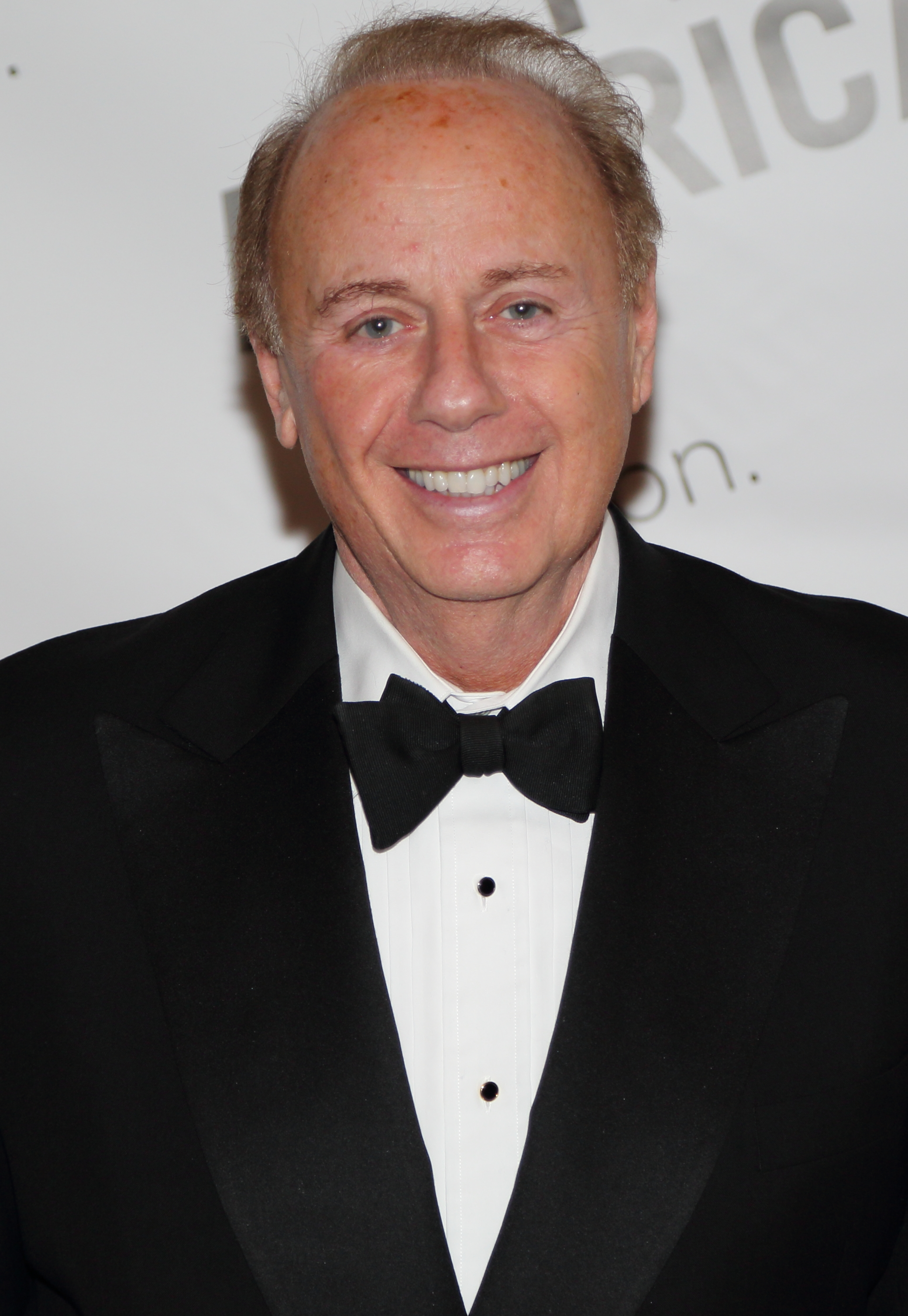
Roger Rosenblatt

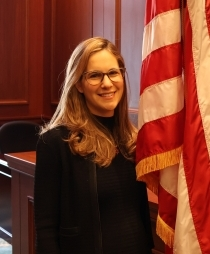
Danielle Sassoon

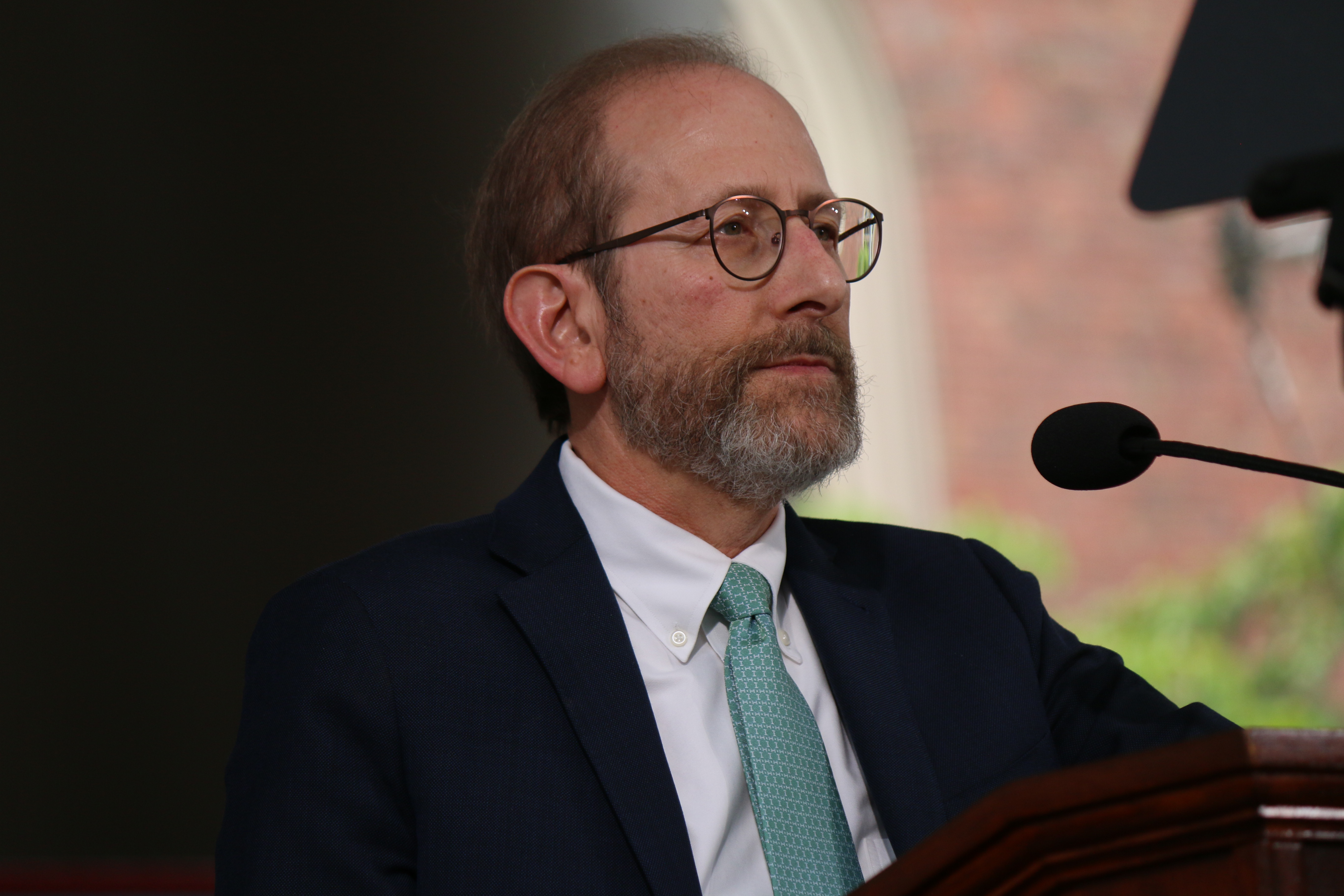
Alan Garber

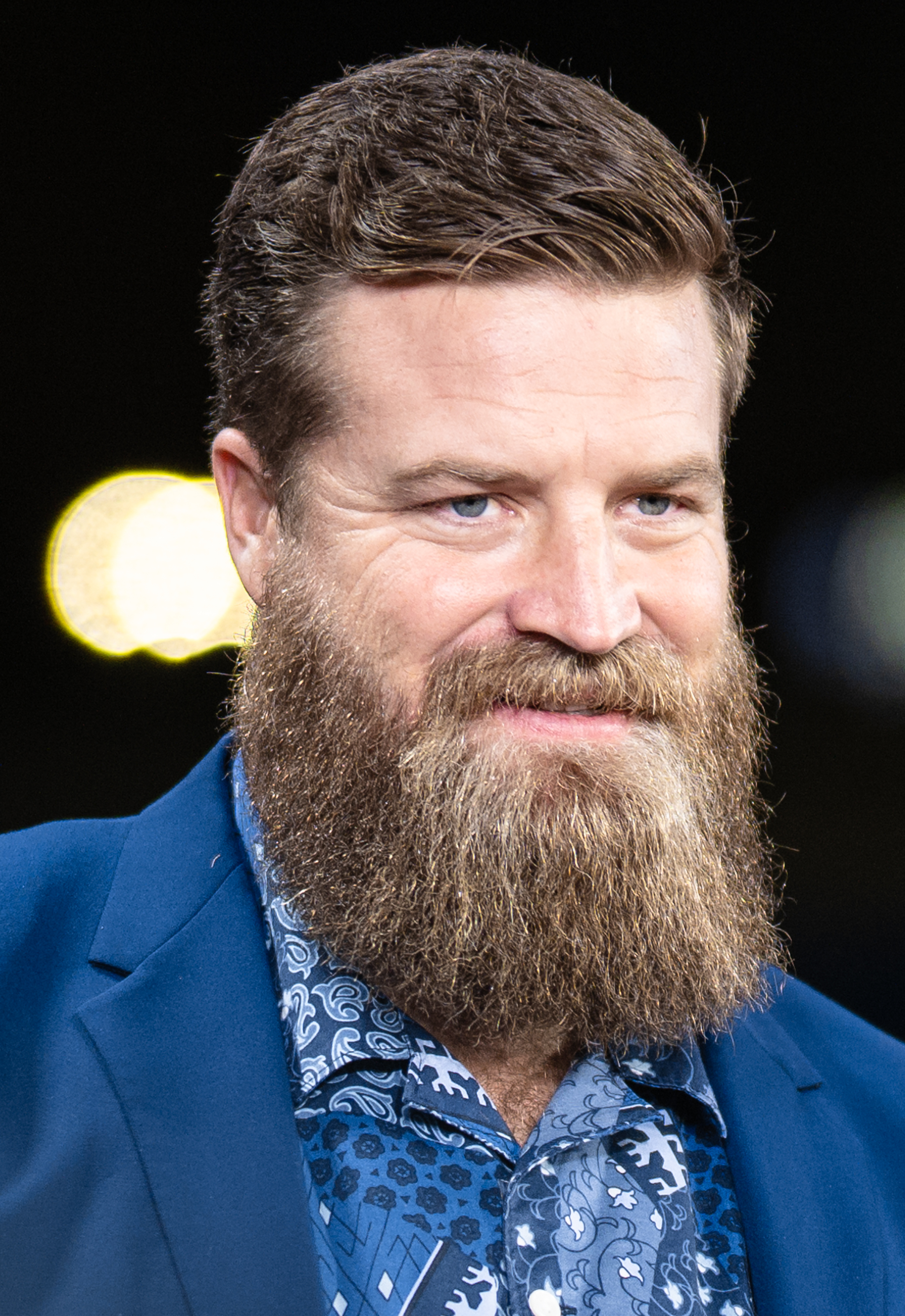
Ryan Fitzpatrick

Al Gore and Tommy Lee Jones were roommates at Dunster House in the late 1960s. Other notable Dunster alumni include Tatyana Ali, Christopher Durang, Lindsay Hyde, Dan Wilson, Michael Mainelli, Jean Kwok, Alan Garber, Ryan Fitzpatrick, and Danielle Sassoon. In 1995, resident Sinedu Tadesse killed her roommate Trang Ho in Dunster before dying by suicide in a closet.
