= Stephan Thernstrom =

American academic and historian (1934–2025)

Stephan Thernstrom (November 5, 1934 – January 23, 2025) was an American academic and historian who was the Winthrop Research Professor of History Emeritus at Harvard University. He was a specialist in ethnic and social history and editor of the Harvard Encyclopedia of American Ethnic Groups. He and his wife Abigail Thernstrom were prominent opponents of affirmative action in education and according to the New York Times, they "lead the conservative charge against racial preference in America."

== Early life and education ==
Thernstrom was born and raised in a working-class family in Port Huron, Michigan. His father was the son of a Swedish-born immigrant laborer and worked on the railroad. Thernstrom was raised a Christian Scientist, but was disillusioned with the faith. His family later moved to Battle Creek, Michigan. Thernstrom received his bachelor's degree from Northwestern University and his Ph.D. from Harvard University, working with Oscar Handlin.

== Career ==
Thernstrom held faculty appointments at Harvard University, Brandeis University and the University of California, Los Angeles. He returned to Harvard with an appointment as a full professor in 1973. From 1978 to 1979 Thernstrom was Pitt Professor of American History and Institutions at the University of Cambridge.

He is the author of several prize-winning books including Poverty and Progress: Social Mobility in the 19th Century and The Other Bostonians: Poverty and Progress in the American Metropolis, 1880-1970, which won the Bancroft Prize in American History and was described by The New York Times Book Review as "the best piece of quantitative history yet published." Thernstrom has served as an expert witness for the defense in more than two dozen federal cases involving claims of racial discrimination in schools. He is the co-author of a brief in "Parents Involved in Community Schools v. Seattle," challenging the constitutionality of Seattle's racial balancing plan.

He co-authored with his wife Abigail Thernstrom No Excuses: Closing the Racial Gap in Learning, named by both the Los Angeles Times and the American School Board Journal as one of the best books of 2003 and the winner of the 2007 Fordham Prize for Distinguished Scholarship. They also co-authored America in Black and White: One Nation, Indivisible, a comprehensive history of race relations which the New York Times Book Review named as one of the notable books of 1997. Their writings had been awarded the Waldo G. Leland Prize, R.R. Hawkins Award, and the Fordham Foundation Prize, 1997 Bradley Foundation prizes for Outstanding Intellectual Achievement, and the 2004 Peter Shaw Memorial Award given by the National Association of Scholars, an organization of conservative scholars. Their work criticizes affirmative action programs.

According to the New York Times, "The couple are much in demand on the conservative talk-show circuit, where they forcefully argue that racial preferences are wrong, divisive and, as a tool to help minorities, overrated. They serve on the boards of conservative and libertarian public-policy institutes."

== Personal life and death ==
Thernstrom married Abigail in 1959. They had two children, Melanie Thernstrom of Palo Alto, CA, a writer, and Samuel Thernstrom. He died on January 23, 2025, at the age of 90.

== Bibliography ==
- Poverty and progress; social mobility in a nineteenth century city (1964) online
- "Yankee City Revisited: The Perils of Historical Naïveté." American Sociological Review (1965) 30#2 : 234-242 online.
- "The Case of Boston." Proceedings of the Massachusetts Historical Society, (1967) vol. 79, pp. 109–122. online
- "Notes on the historical study of social mobility." Comparative Studies in Society and History 10.2 (1968): 162-172 online.
- Nineteenth-century cities; essays in the new urban history (1969) coeditor online
- Poverty, planning, and politics in the new Boston: the origins of ABCD (1969) online
- The other Bostonians; poverty and progress in the American metropolis, 1880-1970 (1973) online
- Harvard encyclopedia of American ethnic groups editor (1980) online
- A history of the American people (1984) online
- "Reflections on the Shape of the River." UCLA Law Review 46 (1998): 1583+ with Abigail Thernstrom. online
- Beyond the color line: new perspectives on race and ethnicity in America (2002) online
- No excuses: Closing the racial gap in learning (2004), with Abigail M. Thernstrom.
- America in black and white: One nation, indivisible (2009), with Abigail M. Thernstrom.
