= Lindsay Hyde =

American activist (born 1982)

Lindsay Hyde

Lindsay Hyde (born 1982) is the founder and President of Strong Women, Strong Girls, Inc. (SWSG), a Massachusetts-based not-for-profit organization that helps at-risk girls in grades 3-5 build positive self-esteem and skills.

Hyde is a 2004 graduate of Harvard University, where she was a resident of Dunster House. She was named one of Glamour Magazine's "Top Ten College Women" in 2003 (). She was named one of 2004s 10 'Outstanding Women" by the YWCA of Cambridge ().

She was awarded the Seventeen Magazine National Youth Volunteerism Award. She also received the National Grand Prize Re-Act Take Action Award (). In June 2006, she received the Samuel S. Beard Award for Greatest Public Service by an Individual 35 Years or Under (). In past years, the award has recognized individuals such as Lance Armstrong, Faith Hill, Sally Ride, Steven Jobs, Max Cleland and Peyton Manning.
