= Jean Goodwin Messinger =

US author

Jean Goodwin Messinger is an author who has written books covering stories of World War II and Holocaust survivors including the book, Hannah: From Dachau to the Olympics and Beyond that she wrote in 2005. That particular book brought Messinger notoriety because it was revealed later after the book's publication that the subject of the book, Rosemarie Pence had lied about her story, which then made the biography fictional.

== False biography ==
Messinger did not verify the stories that Pence had told her, but instead took Pence's stories as factual. Later, when it was revealed that Pence had lied, the biography was then branded as fictional. Messinger commented, "I was terribly embarrassed. Not only for me, but for everyone else touched by this." Messinger further stated, "I regarded this woman as a sister for the years I have known her. This revelation is shocking and disappointing to all of us who knew her and loved her, and counted her as a trusted friend."

== Works ==
- Same War Different Battlefields: Inspiring Stories from Civilians Impacted By WWII - 2015
- Voices From The Other Side: Inspiring German WWII Memoirs - 2014
- Pride, Politics, and Style: History of the 1903 El Paso County Courthouse
- A Closer Look at Beaver Dam - 1981
- Faith in High Places: Historic Country Churches of Colorado (co-author)
- Where Thy Glory Dwells: Historic Churches of Colorado Springs (co-author) - 1998
- Hannah: From Dachau to the Olympics and Beyond
- In the Best of Families
- Same War Different Battlefields - 2008
- With Love from Grandma Jean
- Brody’s List: A Christmas Message for Kids of All Ages - 2012

== Reviews ==
Regarding Voices From The Other Side: Inspiring German WWII Memoirs, World War II Today said:

"Jean Goodwin Messinger has done a very valuable service in bringing together a collection of stories from elderly residents of Colorado, USA. All of them eventually found peace and security in America but they all began their lives in very different circumstances, in Hitler’s Germany."
