= Marki (disambiguation) =

Marki is in Masovian Voivodeship, east-central Poland.

Marki may also refer to:

== Places ==
- Marki Alonia, a prehistoric settlement in central Cyprus
- Marki, Łódź Voivodeship (central Poland)
- Marki, Podlaskie Voivodeship (north-east Poland)
- Marki, Subcarpathian Voivodeship (south-east Poland)
- Marki, Opole Voivodeship (south-west Poland)
- Marki, Voronezh Oblast, Russia

== People ==
- Marki Bey (born 1947), an American actress
- MarkiLokuras (born 1997), a Spanish YouTuber and content creator
- Dominik Märki (born 1990), a Swiss-American curler
- Ferenc Marki (1912–2008), an internationally known fencing master and coach
- Hansruedi Märki (born 1960), a Swiss former cyclist
- Raphael Märki (born 1992), a Swiss curler
- Traugott Märki, a Swiss footballer

== See also ==
- Mark I (disambiguation)
