= Blood alcohol content =

Metric of alcohol concentration in blood

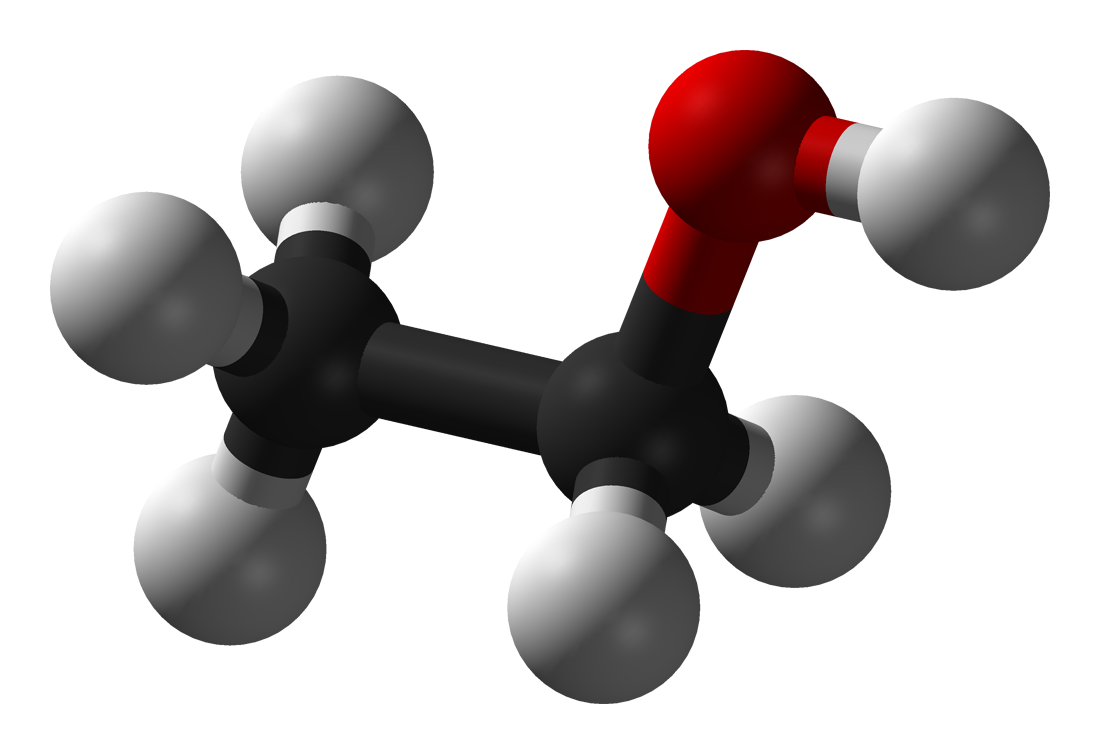
- Ethanol
- Synonyms: Blood alcohol concentration, blood ethanol concentration, blood alcohol level
- LOINC: 5639-0, 5640-8, 15120-9, 56478-1

Blood alcohol content (BAC), also known as blood alcohol concentration or blood alcohol level, is the concentration of alcohol in a person's blood, measured for legal or medical purposes.

BAC is expressed as the mass of alcohol per unit volume of blood. In the United States and many other countries, it is commonly reported as a percentage, such as 0.08% (equivalent to 0.8 g/L). Legal limits for driving vary by country, ranging from zero tolerance policies to 0.08%. Levels above 0.40% (4 g/L) may be fatal.

== Units of measurement ==
BAC is the mass of alcohol per unit volume of blood. The SI unit is kilogram per cubic metre (kg/m^{3}), though it is commonly reported as grams per liter (g/L). Reporting conventions vary by country.

In the United States and several other countries, BAC is expressed as a percentage, such as 0.05%. This corresponds to 0.05 grams per deciliter of blood. The same concentration may be expressed as 0.5‰ or 50 mg% in other jurisdictions.

Sign	Units	Used in
1 percent (%), 1 g%	1 g/dL = 10 g/L = 1 g/100 mL	United States, Australia, Canada
1 per mille (‰)	1 g/L = 100 mg/100 mL	Used in many European countries
1 mg%	1 mg/dL = 0.01 g/L	United Kingdom, Ireland, Canada, New Zealand

Historically, some researchers reported BAC as mass of alcohol per mass of blood (g/kg or mg/g). Because blood is slightly denser than water (about 1.05 g/mL), 1 g/L is approximately equal to 0.95 mg/g. Some countries define legal limits using mass–mass units, though public information often treats 1 liter of blood as equivalent to 1 kilogram.

In pharmacokinetics, concentrations may be expressed in moles. As the molar mass of ethanol is 46.07 g/mol, a concentration of 1 g/L is equivalent to about 21.7 mmol/L (21.7 mM).

== Effects by alcohol level ==
Alcohol level			Effects	Ref.
BAC (%)	per mille (‰)	mg (%)	Effects	Ref.
0.01–0.05	0.1–0.5	10–50	Mild relaxation and reduced social inhibition; impaired judgment and coordination	
0.06–0.2	0.6–2	60–200	Emotional swings, impaired vision, hearing, speech, and motor skills	
0.2–0.3	2–3	200–300	Urinary incontinence, vomiting, and symptoms of alcohol intoxication	
0.3–0.4	3–4	300–400	Potential total loss of consciousness; signs of severe alcohol intoxication	
> 0.4	> 4	> 400	Potentially fatal, may result in a coma or respiratory failure	

The magnitude of sensory impairment may vary in people of differing weights. The NIAAA defines the term "binge drinking" as a pattern of drinking that brings a person's blood alcohol concentration (BAC) to 0.08 grams percent or above.

== Estimation ==
=== Direct measurement ===
Blood samples for BAC analysis are typically obtained by taking a venous blood sample from the arm. A variety of methods exist for determining blood-alcohol concentration in a blood sample. Forensic laboratories typically use headspace-gas chromatography combined with mass spectrometry or flame ionization detection, as this method is accurate and efficient. Hospitals typically use enzyme multiplied immunoassay, which measures the co-enzyme NADH. This method is more subject to error but may be performed rapidly in parallel with other blood sample measurements.

In Germany, BAC is determined by measuring the serum level and then converting to whole blood by dividing by the factor 1.236. This calculation underestimates BAC by 4% to 10% compared to other methods.

=== By breathalyzer ===
The amount of alcohol on the breath can be measured, without requiring drawing blood, by blowing into a breathalyzer, resulting in a breath alcohol content (BrAC). The BrAC specifically correlates with the concentration of alcohol in arterial blood, satisfying the equation BAC_{arterial} = BrAC × 2251 ± 46. Its correlation with the standard BAC found by drawing venous blood is less strong. Jurisdictions vary in the statutory conversion factor from BrAC to BAC, from 2000 to 2400. Many factors may affect the accuracy of a breathalyzer test, but they are the most common method for measuring alcohol concentrations in most jurisdictions.

=== By intake ===
Blood alcohol content can be quickly estimated by a model developed by Swedish professor Erik Widmark in the 1920s. The model corresponds to a pharmacokinetic single-compartment model with instantaneous absorption and zero-order kinetics for elimination. The model is most accurate when used to estimate BAC a few hours after drinking a single dose of alcohol in a fasted state, and can be within 20% CV of the true value. It is not at all realistic for the absorption phase, and is not accurate for BAC levels below 0.2 g/L (alcohol is not eliminated as quickly as predicted) and consumption with food (overestimating the peak BAC and time to return to zero). The equation varies depending on the units and approximations used, but in its simplest form is given by:

$$EBAC = \frac{A}{V_d}-\beta\times T$$

where:

- EBAC is the estimated blood alcohol concentration (in g/L)
- A is the mass of alcohol consumed (g).
- T is the amount of time during that alcohol was present in the blood (usually time since consumption began), in hours.
- β is the rate at which alcohol is eliminated, averaging around 0.15 g/L/hr.
- V_{d} is the volume of distribution (L); typically body weight (kg) multiplied by 0.71 L/kg for men and 0.58 L/kg for women although estimation using TBW is more accurate.

A standard drink, defined by the WHO as 10 grams of pure alcohol, is the most frequently used measure in many countries. Examples:

- An 80 kg man drinks 20 grams ethanol. After one hour:

$$EBAC = 20/(0.71 \cdot 80) - (0.148 \cdot 1) \approx 0.204 \text{g/L} = 0.0204% \text{BAC}$$

- A 70 kg woman drinks 10 grams of ethanol. After one hour:

$$EBAC = 10/(0.58 \cdot 70) - (0.156 \cdot 1) \approx 0.090 \text{g/L} = 0.0090% \text{BAC}$$

In terms of fluid ounces of alcohol consumed and weight in pounds, Widmark's formula can be simply approximated as

$$EBAC=8\times\text{fl oz}/\text{weight in pounds}-\beta\times T$$

for a man or

$$EBAC=10\times\text{fl oz}/\text{weight in pounds}-\beta\times T$$

for a woman, where EBAC and β factors are given as g/dL (% BAC), such as a β factor of 0.015% BAC per hour.

=== By standard drinks ===
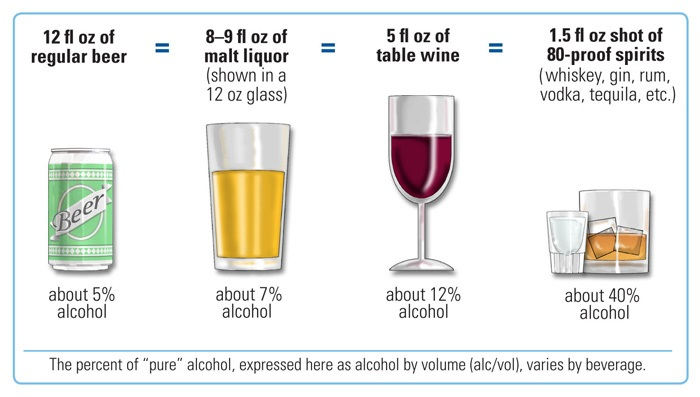
United States standard drinks of beer, malt liquor, wine, and spirits compared. Each contains about 14 grams or 17.7 mL of ethanol.

This assumes a US standard drink, i.e. 0.6 US fl oz (17.7 mL) or 14 g (0.5 oz) of ethanol, whereas other definitions exist. For example, in the UK 1 standard drink is 8 grams and in Australia it is 10 grams.

Approximate blood alcohol percentage (by volume) Based on one drink having 17.7 mL alcohol by volume
Drinks	Sex	Body weight								
Drinks	Sex	45 kg 100 lb	55 kg 120 lb	64 kg 140 lb	73 kg 160 lb	82 kg 180 lb	91 kg 200 lb	100 kg 220 lb	109 kg 240 lb	
1	Male	–	0.04	0.03	0.03	0.02	0.02	0.02	0.02	0.02
1	Female	0.05	0.05	0.04	0.03	0.03	0.03	0.02	0.02	0.02
2	Male	–	0.08	0.06	0.05	0.05	0.04	0.04	0.03	0.03
2	Female	0.10	0.09	0.08	0.07	0.06	0.05	0.05	0.04	0.04
3	Male	–	0.11	0.09	0.08	0.07	0.06	0.06	0.05	0.05
3	Female	0.15	0.14	0.11	0.10	0.09	0.08	0.07	0.06	0.06
4	Male	–	0.15	0.12	0.11	0.09	0.08	0.08	0.07	0.06
4	Female	0.20	0.18	0.15	0.13	0.11	0.10	0.09	0.08	0.08
5	Male	–	0.19	0.16	0.13	0.12	0.11	0.09	0.09	0.08
5	Female	0.25	0.23	0.19	0.16	0.14	0.13	0.11	0.10	0.09
6	Male	–	0.23	0.19	0.16	0.14	0.13	0.11	0.10	0.09
6	Female	0.30	0.27	0.23	0.19	0.17	0.15	0.14	0.12	0.11
7	Male	–	0.26	0.22	0.19	0.16	0.15	0.13	0.12	0.11
7	Female	0.35	0.32	0.27	0.23	0.20	0.18	0.16	0.14	0.13
8	Male	–	0.30	0.25	0.21	0.19	0.17	0.15	0.14	0.13
8	Female	0.40	0.36	0.30	0.26	0.23	0.20	0.18	0.17	0.15
9	Male	–	0.34	0.28	0.24	0.21	0.19	0.17	0.15	0.14
9	Female	0.45	0.41	0.34	0.29	0.26	0.23	0.20	0.19	0.17
10	Male	–	0.38	0.31	0.27	0.23	0.21	0.19	0.17	0.16
10	Female	0.51	0.45	0.38	0.32	0.28	0.25	0.23	0.21	0.19
Subtract approximately 0.01 every 40 minutes after drinking.

=== By training ===
If individuals are asked to estimate their BAC, then given accurate feedback via a breathalyzer, and this procedure is repeated a number of times during a drinking session, studies show that these individuals can learn to discriminate their BAC, to within a mean error of 9 mg/100 mL (0.009% BAC). The ability is robust to different types of alcohol, different drink quantities, and drinks with unknown levels of alcohol. Trained individuals can even drink alcoholic drinks so as to adjust or maintain their BAC at a desired level. Training the ability does not appear to require any information or procedure besides breathalyzer feedback, although most studies have provided information such as intoxication symptoms at different BAC levels. Subjects continue to retain the ability one month after training.

=== Post-mortem ===
After fatal accidents, it is common to check the blood alcohol levels of involved persons. Soon after death, however, the body begins to putrefy, a biological process that produces ethanol. This can make it difficult to conclusively determine the blood alcohol content in autopsies, particularly in bodies recovered from water. For instance, following the 1975 Moorgate tube crash, the driver's kidneys had a blood alcohol concentration of 80 mg/100 mL, but it could not be established how much of this could be attributed to natural decomposition. Newer research has shown that vitreous (eye) fluid provides an accurate estimate of blood alcohol concentration that is less subject to the effects of decomposition or contamination.

== Legal limits ==
Map of Europe showing countries' blood alcohol limits as defined in g/dL for the general population

For purposes of law enforcement, blood alcohol content is used to define intoxication and provides a rough measure of impairment. Although the degree of impairment may vary among individuals with the same blood alcohol content, it can be measured objectively and is therefore legally useful and difficult to contest in court. Most countries forbid operation of motor vehicles and heavy machinery above prescribed levels of blood alcohol content. Operation of boats and aircraft is also regulated. Some jurisdictions also regulate bicycling under the influence. The alcohol level at which a person is considered legally impaired to drive varies by country.

== Test assumptions ==
=== Extrapolation ===
Retrograde extrapolation is the mathematical process by which someone's blood alcohol concentration at the time of driving is estimated by projecting backwards from a later chemical test. This involves estimating the absorption and elimination of alcohol in the interim between driving and testing. The rate of elimination in the average person is commonly estimated at 0.015 to 0.020 grams per deciliter per hour (g/dL/h), although again this can vary from person to person and in a given person from one moment to another. Metabolism can be affected by numerous factors, including such things as body temperature, the type of alcoholic beverage consumed, and the amount and type of food consumed.

In an increasing number of states, laws have been enacted to facilitate this speculative task: the blood alcohol content at the time of driving is legally presumed to be the same as when later tested. There are usually time limits put on this presumption, commonly two or three hours, and the defendant is permitted to offer evidence to rebut this presumption.

Forward extrapolation can also be attempted. If the amount of alcohol consumed is known, along with such variables as the weight and sex of the subject and period and rate of consumption, the blood alcohol level can be estimated by extrapolating forward. Although subject to the same infirmities as retrograde extrapolation—guessing based upon averages and unknown variables—this can be relevant in estimating BAC when driving and/or corroborating or contradicting the results of a later chemical test.

== Metabolism ==
The pharmacokinetics of ethanol are well characterized by the ADME acronym (absorption, distribution, metabolism, excretion). Besides the dose ingested, factors such as the person's total body water, speed of drinking, the drink's nutritional content, and the contents of the stomach all influence the profile of blood alcohol content (BAC) over time. Breath alcohol content (BrAC) and BAC have similar profile shapes, so most forensic pharmacokinetic calculations can be done with either. Relatively few studies directly compare BrAC and BAC within subjects and characterize the difference in pharmacokinetic parameters. Comparing arterial and venous BAC, arterial BAC is higher during the absorption phase and lower in the postabsorptive declining phase.

== Highest levels ==
According to Guinness World Records, the 2013 incident where a BAC of 1.374% (13.74 g/L) was recorded is the highest BAC recorded in a human who survived the ordeal.

Date	BAC (%)	Location	Description	Result (died or survived)	Cause of Death (If Died)
1982	1.33 BAC, approximated from 1.51 SAC	Los Angeles, California, USA	A 24-year-old woman was admitted to the UCLA emergency room with a serum alcohol content of 1.51%, corresponding to a blood alcohol content of 1.33%. She was alert and oriented to person and place and survived. Serum alcohol concentration is not equal to nor calculated in the same way as blood alcohol content.	Survived	
1984	1.50		A 30-year-old man survived a blood alcohol concentration of 1.5% after vigorous medical intervention that included dialysis and intravenous therapy with fructose.	Survived	
1995	1.48	Wrocław, Poland	In 1995, a man from Wrocław, Poland, caused a car crash near his hometown. He had a blood alcohol content of 1.48%; he was tested five times, with each test returning the same reading. He died a few days later of injuries from the accident.	Died	Injuries from a car crash
2004	1.35	Taiwan	In 2004, an unidentified Taiwanese woman died of alcohol intoxication after immersion for twelve hours in a bathtub filled with 40% ethanol. Her blood alcohol content was 1.35%. It was believed that she had immersed herself as a response to the early 2000s outbreak of SARS.	Died	Alcohol intoxication
22 Dec 2010	1.60	Queenstown, South Africa	In South Africa, a man driving a Mercedes-Benz Vito light van containing 15 sheep allegedly stolen from nearby farms was arrested on 22 December 2010, near Queenstown in Eastern Cape. His blood had an alcohol content of 1.6%. Also in the vehicle were five boys and a woman, who were also arrested.	Survived	
26 Oct 2012	2.23 (possible contamination)	Gmina Olszewo-Borki, Poland	A man died in a car crash, recorded a blood alcohol content of 2.23%; nonetheless, the blood sample was collected from a wound and thus possibly contaminated.	Died	Injuries from a car crash
26 July 2013	1.374	Alfredówka, Poland	A 30-year-old man from Alfredówka, Poland, was found unconscious by Municipal Police Patrol from Nowa Dęba lying in the ditch along the road in Tarnowska Wola. First responders reportedly did not believe the initial BAC readings taken at the scene. At the hospital, it was recorded that the man had a blood alcohol content of 1.374%. The man survived.	Survived	
