= Nowy Grębów =

- Village
- Location within Poland
- Coordinates: 50°32′46″N 21°54′05″E
- Country: Poland
- Voivodeship: Podkarpackie
- County: Tarnobrzeg
- Gmina: Grębów

Nowy Grębów [ˈnɔvɨ ˈɡrɛmbuf] is a village in the administrative district of Gmina Grębów, within Tarnobrzeg County, Podkarpackie Voivodeship, in south-eastern Poland.
