= Piasek, Podkarpackie Voivodeship =

Piasek
- Village
- Location within Poland
- Coordinates: 50°34′9″N 21°53′12″E
- Country: Poland
- Voivodeship: Subcarpathian
- County: Tarnobrzeg
- Gmina: Grębów

Piasek [ˈpʲasɛk] is a village in the administrative district of Gmina Grębów, within Tarnobrzeg County, Subcarpathian Voivodeship, in south-eastern Poland.
