= Rozalin, Podkarpackie Voivodeship =

Rozalin
- Village
- Location within Poland
- Coordinates: 50°27′N 21°41′E
- Country: Poland
- Voivodeship: Subcarpathian
- County: Tarnobrzeg
- Gmina: Nowa Dęba

Rozalin [rɔˈzalʲin] is a village in the administrative district of Gmina Nowa Dęba, within Tarnobrzeg County, Subcarpathian Voivodeship, in south-eastern Poland.
