= Knapy, Podkarpackie Voivodeship =

Knapy
- Village
- Location within Poland
- Coordinates: 50°26′N 21°34′E
- Country: Poland
- Voivodeship: Subcarpathian
- County: Tarnobrzeg
- Gmina: Baranów Sandomierski

Population
  - Total: 599
- Time zone: UTC+1 (CET)
  - Summer (DST): UTC+2 (CEST)
- Vehicle registration: RTA

Knapy [ˈknapɨ] is a village in the administrative district of Gmina Baranów Sandomierski, within Tarnobrzeg County, Subcarpathian Voivodeship, in south-eastern Poland.

Five Polish citizens were murdered by Nazi Germany in the village during World War II.
