= Gmina Gorzyce =

Gmina Gorzyce may refer to either of the following rural administrative districts in Poland:

- Gmina Gorzyce, Subcarpathian Voivodeship
- Gmina Gorzyce, Silesian Voivodeship
