= Dąbrowica, Tarnobrzeg County =

Dąbrowica
- Village
- Location within Poland
- Coordinates: 50°29′N 21°37′E
- Country: Poland
- Voivodeship: Subcarpathian
- County: Tarnobrzeg
- Gmina: Baranów Sandomierski

Dąbrowica [dɔmbrɔˈvʲit͡sa] is a village in the administrative district of Gmina Baranów Sandomierski, within Tarnobrzeg County, Subcarpathian Voivodeship, in south-eastern Poland.
