= Zabrnie Górne =

- Village
- Location within Poland
- Coordinates: 50°35′40″N 21°51′8″E
- Country: Poland
- Voivodeship: Subcarpathian
- County: Tarnobrzeg
- Gmina: Grębów

Zabrnie Górne [ˈzabrɲɛ ˈɡurnɛ] is a village in the administrative district of Gmina Grębów, within Tarnobrzeg County, Subcarpathian Voivodeship, in south-eastern Poland.
