= Krawce =

- Village
- Location within Poland
- Coordinates: 50°31′N 21°55′E
- Country: Poland
- Voivodeship: Subcarpathian
- County: Tarnobrzeg
- Gmina: Grębów

Krawce [ˈkraft͡sɛ] is a village in the administrative district of Gmina Grębów, within Tarnobrzeg County, Subcarpathian Voivodeship, in south-eastern Poland.
