= Dymitrów Mały =

- Village
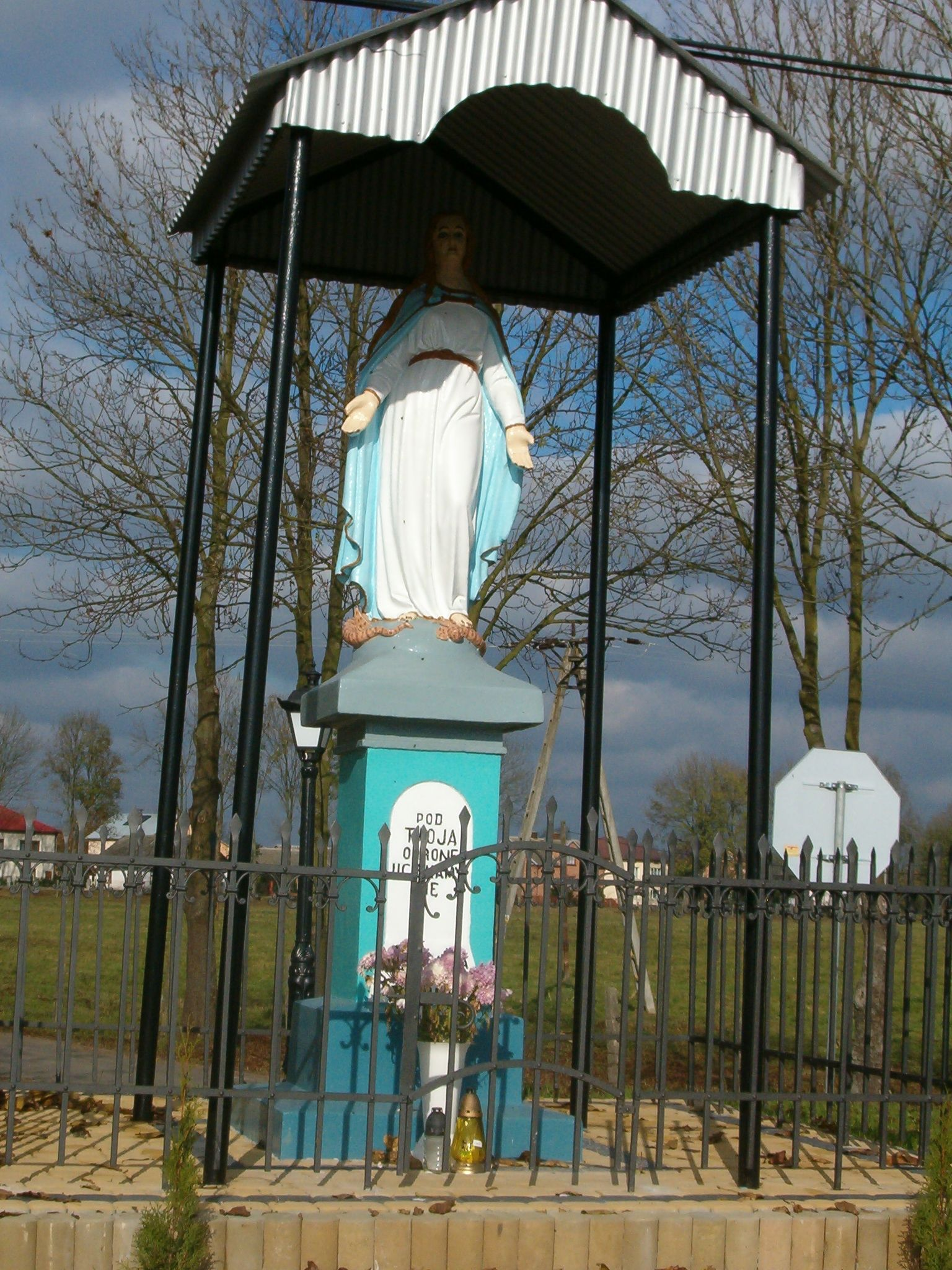

- Location within Poland
- Coordinates: 50°29′N 21°30′E
- Country: Poland
- Voivodeship: Subcarpathian
- County: Tarnobrzeg
- Gmina: Baranów Sandomierski
- Time zone: UTC+1 (CET)
  - Summer (DST): UTC+2 (CEST)
- Vehicle registration: RTA

Dymitrów Mały [dɨˈmʲitruf ˈmawɨ] is a village in the administrative district of Gmina Baranów Sandomierski, within Tarnobrzeg County, Subcarpathian Voivodeship, in south-eastern Poland.

Three Polish citizens were murdered by Nazi Germany in the village during World War II.
