= Kąt, Tarnobrzeg County =

Kąt
- Village
- Location within Poland
- Coordinates: 50°34′13″N 21°52′9″E
- Country: Poland
- Voivodeship: Subcarpathian
- County: Tarnobrzeg
- Gmina: Grębów

Kąt [kɔnt] is a village in the administrative district of Gmina Grębów, within Tarnobrzeg County, Subcarpathian Voivodeship, in south-eastern Poland.
