= Suchorzów =

- Village
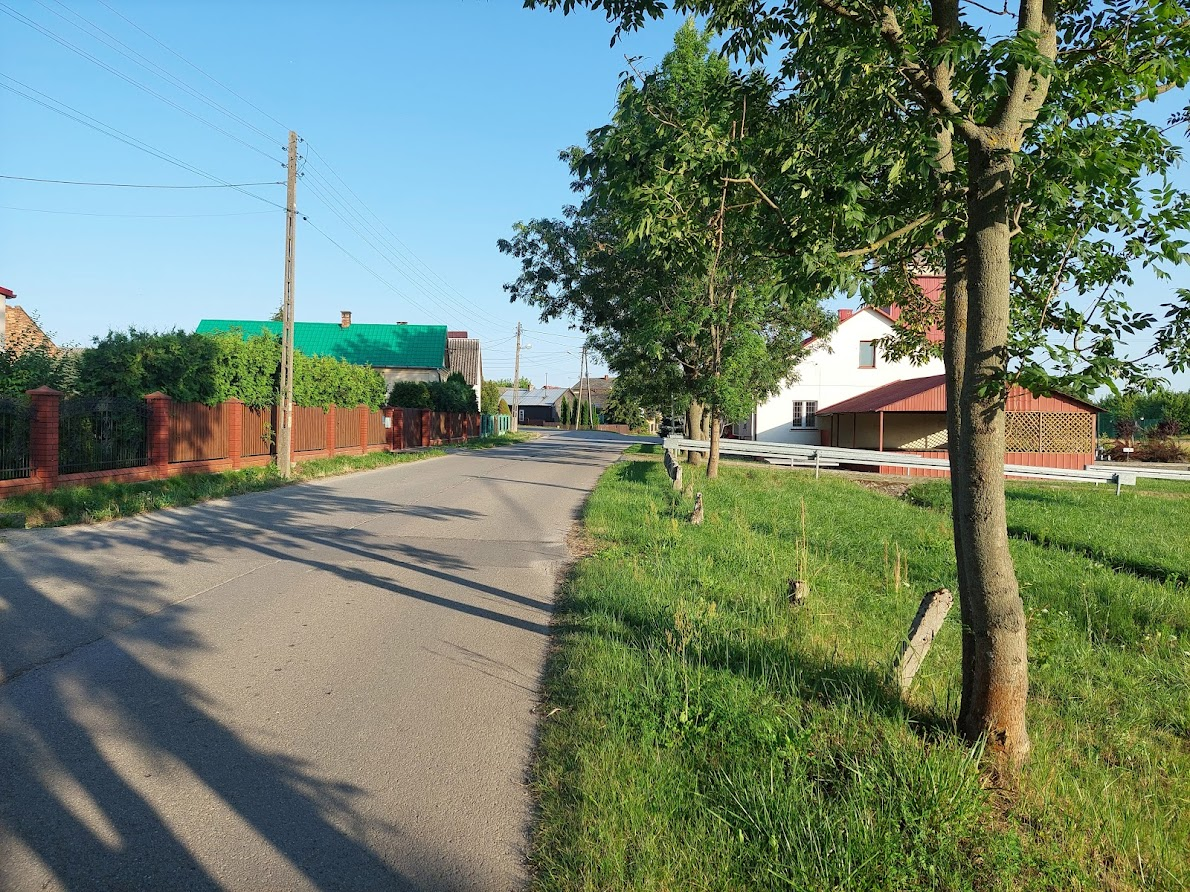

- Location within Poland
- Coordinates: 50°30′N 21°35′E
- Country: Poland
- Voivodeship: Subcarpathian
- County: Tarnobrzeg
- Gmina: Baranów Sandomierski

Suchorzów [suˈxɔʐuf] is a village in the administrative district of Gmina Baranów Sandomierski, within Tarnobrzeg County, Subcarpathian Voivodeship, in south-eastern Poland.
