= Wydrza =

- Village
- Location within Poland
- Coordinates: 50°32′N 21°52′E
- Country: Poland
- Voivodeship: Subcarpathian
- County: Tarnobrzeg
- Gmina: Grębów

Wydrza [ˈvɨdʐa] is a village in the administrative district of Gmina Grębów, Tarnobrzeg County, Subcarpathian Voivodeship, Poland.
