= Zapolednik =

- Village
- Location within Poland
- Coordinates: 50°32′35″N 21°54′46″E
- Country: Poland
- Voivodeship: Subcarpathian
- County: Tarnobrzeg
- Gmina: Grębów

Zapolednik [zapɔˈlɛdɲik] is a village in the administrative district of Gmina Grębów, within Tarnobrzeg County, Subcarpathian Voivodeship, in south-eastern Poland.
