= Furmany =

- Village
- Location within Poland
- Coordinates: 50°37′N 21°48′E
- Country: Poland
- Voivodeship: Subcarpathian
- County: Tarnobrzeg
- Gmina: Gorzyce

Furmany [furˈmanɨ] is a village in the administrative district of Gmina Gorzyce, within Tarnobrzeg County, Subcarpathian Voivodeship, in south-eastern Poland.
