= Motycze Poduchowne =

- Village
- Location within Poland
- Coordinates: 50°40′N 21°51′E
- Country: Poland
- Voivodeship: Subcarpathian
- County: Tarnobrzeg
- Gmina: Gorzyce

Motycze Poduchowne [mɔˈtɨt͡ʂɛ pɔduˈxɔvnɛ] is a village in the administrative district of Gmina Gorzyce, within Tarnobrzeg County, Subcarpathian Voivodeship, in south-eastern Poland.
