= Wola Baranowska =

- Village
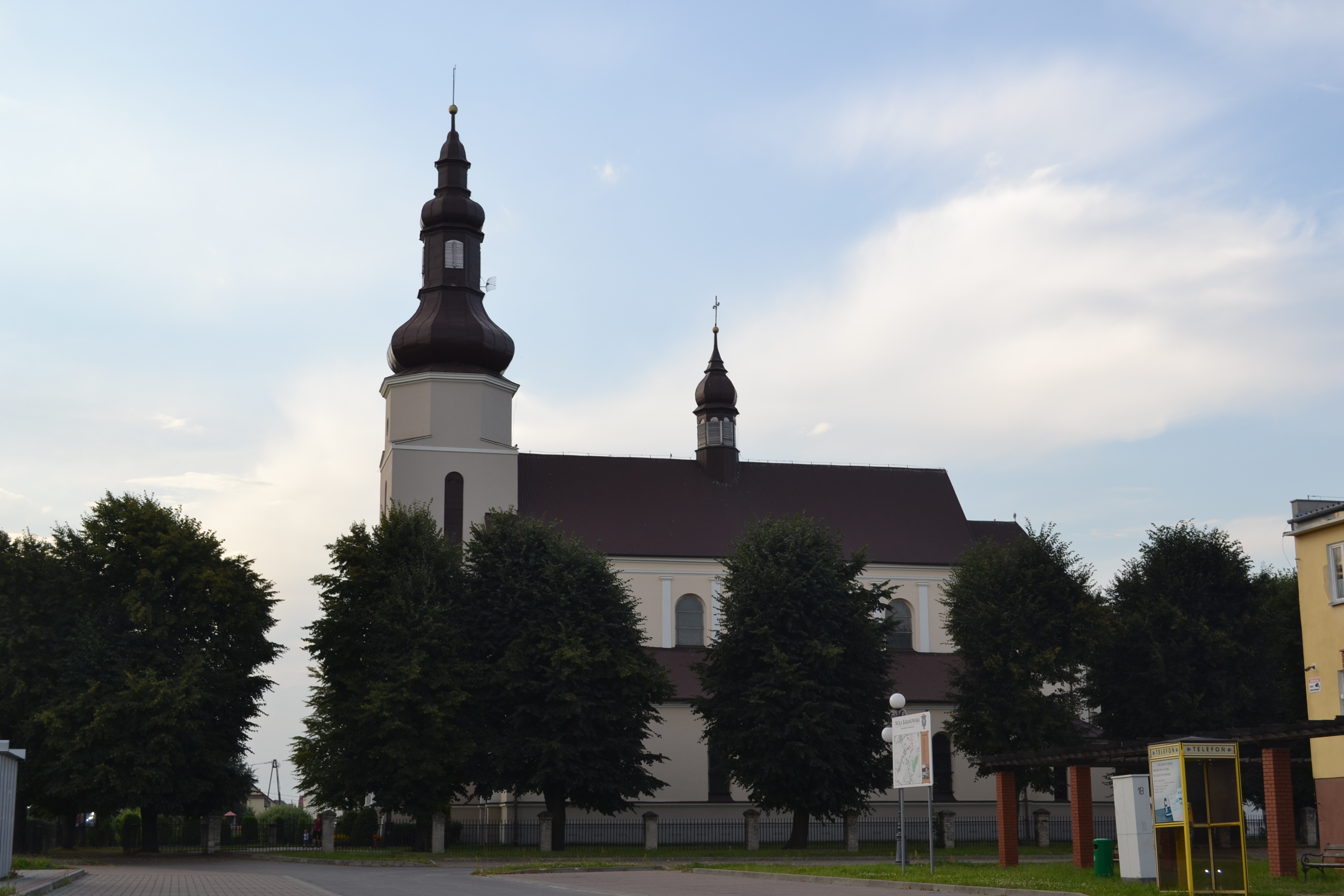

- Location within Poland
- Coordinates: 50°27′N 21°34′E
- Country: Poland
- Voivodeship: Subcarpathian
- County: Tarnobrzeg
- Gmina: Baranów Sandomierski
- Population: 2,266
- Website: http://www.wolabaranowska.pl

Wola Baranowska [ˈvɔla baraˈnɔfska] is a village in the administrative district of Gmina Baranów Sandomierski, within Tarnobrzeg County, Subcarpathian Voivodeship, in south-eastern Poland.
