= Poręby Furmańskie =

- Village
- Location within Poland
- Coordinates: 50°36′N 21°50′E
- Country: Poland
- Voivodeship: Subcarpathian
- County: Tarnobrzeg
- Gmina: Grębów

Poręby Furmańskie [pɔˈrɛmbɨ furˈmaɲskʲɛ] is a village in the administrative district of Gmina Grębów, within Tarnobrzeg County, Subcarpathian Voivodeship, in south-eastern Poland.

In 1975–1998, the town administratively belonged to the Tarnobrzeg Voivodeship.
