= Dusty Sklar =

American author and Nazism researcher

Ethel K. Sklar (born March 11, 1928), known as Dusty Sklar, is an American author and researcher specialising in Nazism, based in New Jersey. Sklar is a member of the American Society of Journalists and Authors (ASJA) and Investigative Reporters and Editors.

== Personal life ==
She was born in Sokół, Poland, and emigrated to the United States with her family in 1930. Her maiden name is Kwalbrun. On November 27, 1949, she married David Sklar, and the couple had three children. Their marriage ended in divorce in 1988.

== Work ==
- The Nazis and the Occult (1977), 1st Dorset Press edition. Dorset Press Publishing; ISBN 0880294124, ISBN 978-0880294126; ASIN: B0022MWFEI
- Gods and Beasts: The Nazis and the Occult (1977), first edition. 180 pp hardcover. T.Y. Crowell Publishing; ISBN 0690012322; ISBN 978-0690012323.
