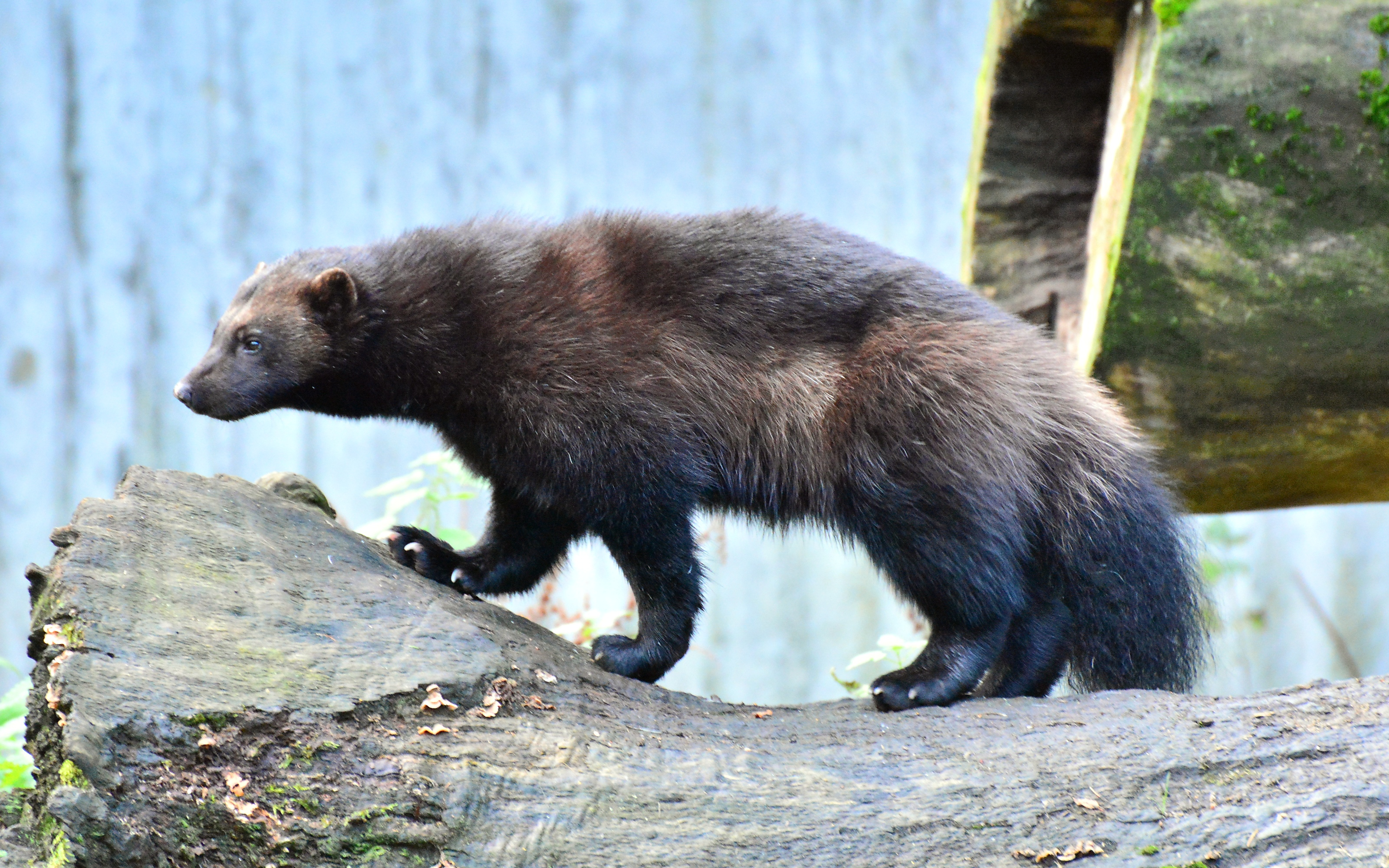

Conservation status
- Least Concern (IUCN 3.1) (Global)

- Vulnerable (IUCN 3.1) (Europe)

Scientific classification
- Kingdom: Animalia
- Phylum: Chordata
- Class: Mammalia
- Order: Carnivora
- Family: Mustelidae
- Genus: Gulo
- Species: G. gulo

Binomial name
- Gulo gulo (Linnaeus, 1758)

Subspecies
- American wolverine (G. g. luscus); Eurasian wolverine (G. g. gulo)
- Wolverine ranges

Synonyms
- Mustela gulo Linnaeus, 1758; Ursus luscus Linnaeus, 1758

= Wolverine =

Wolverine Temporal range: Pleistocene–recent, 2.588–0 Ma

Species of the family Mustelidae

The wolverine (/ˈwʊlvəriːn/ WUUL-və-reen, US also /ˌwʊlvəˈriːn/ WUUL-və-REEN; Gulo gulo), also called the carcajou or quickhatch (from East Cree, kwiihkwahaacheew), is the largest land-dwelling member of the family Mustelidae. It is a muscular carnivore and a solitary animal. The wolverine has a reputation for ferocity and strength out of proportion to its size, with the documented ability to kill prey many times larger than itself.

The wolverine is found primarily in remote reaches of the northern boreal forests and subarctic and alpine tundra of the Northern Hemisphere, with the greatest numbers in Northern Canada, the U.S. state of Alaska, the mainland Nordic countries of Europe, and throughout western Russia and Siberia. Its population has steadily declined since the 19th century owing to trapping, range reduction and habitat fragmentation. The wolverine has become essentially absent from the southern end of its range in both Europe and North America.

== Naming ==
The wolverine's questionable reputation as an insatiable glutton (reflected in its Latin genus name Gulo, meaning "glutton") may be in part due to a false etymology. The less common name for the animal in Norwegian, fjellfross, meaning "mountain cat", is thought to have worked its way into German as Vielfraß, which means "glutton" (literally "devours much"). Its name in other West Germanic languages is similar (e.g. Dutch: veelvraat).

The Finnish name is ahma, derived from ahmatti, which is translated as "glutton". Similarly, the Estonian name is ahm, with the equivalent meaning to the Finnish name. In Lithuanian, it is ernis; in Latvian, tinis or āmrija.

The Eastern Slavic росомаха (rosomakha) and the Polish and Czech name rosomák seem to be borrowed from the Finnish rasva-maha (fat belly). Similarly, the Hungarian name is rozsomák or torkosborz which means "gluttonous badger".

In French-speaking parts of Canada, the wolverine is referred to as carcajou, borrowed from the Innu-aimun or Montagnais kuàkuàtsheu. However, in France, the wolverine's name is glouton (glutton).

Purported gluttony is reflected neither in the English name wolverine nor in the names used in North Germanic languages. The English word wolverine (alteration of the earlier form, wolvering, of uncertain origin) probably implies "a little wolf". The name in Proto-Norse, erafaz and Old Norse, jarfr, lives on in the regular Icelandic name jarfi, regular Norwegian name jerv, regular Swedish name järv and regular Danish name jærv.

== Taxonomy and evolutionary history ==
=== Classification ===
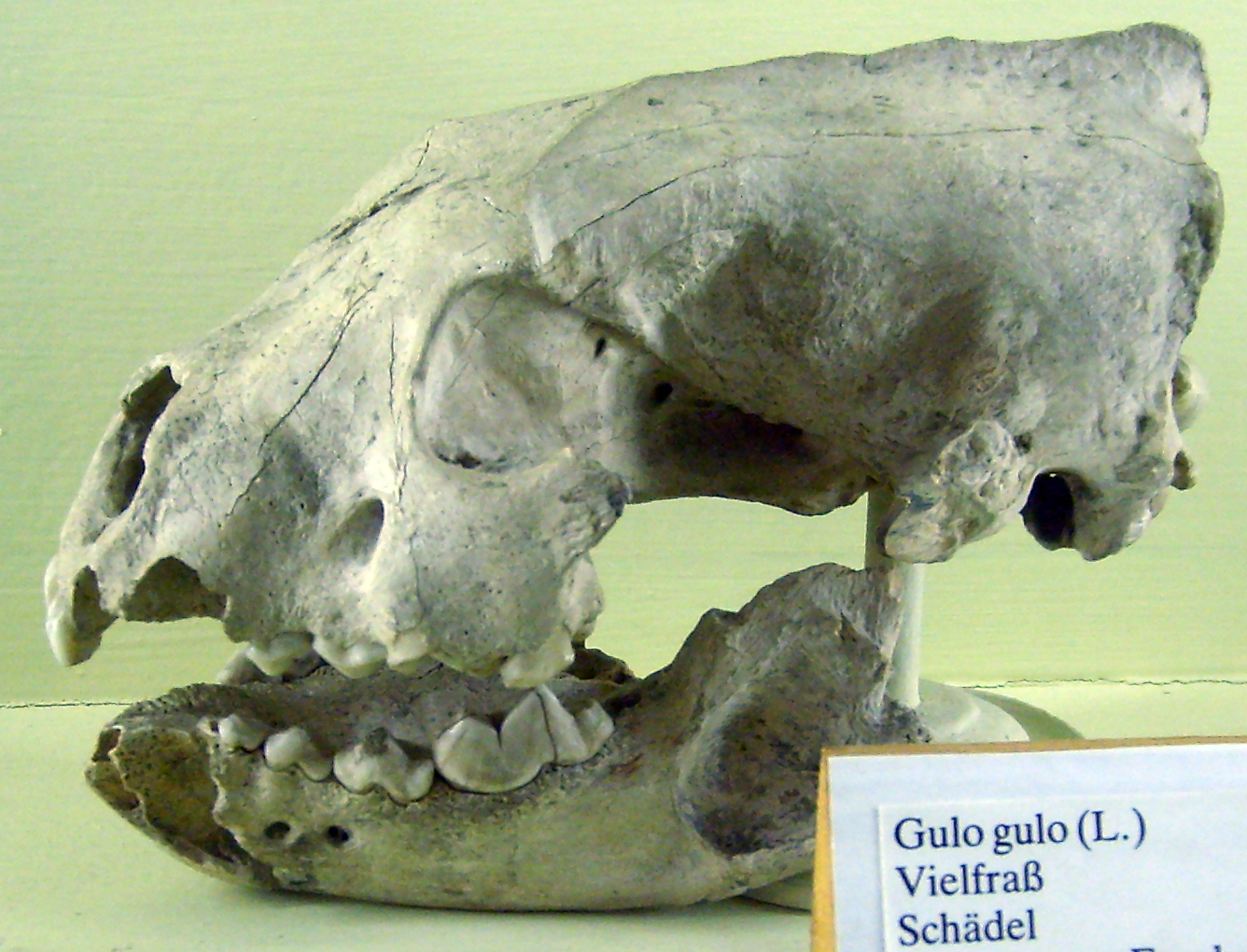
Wolverine skull from the Pleistocene of Germany at the Natural History Museum, Berlin

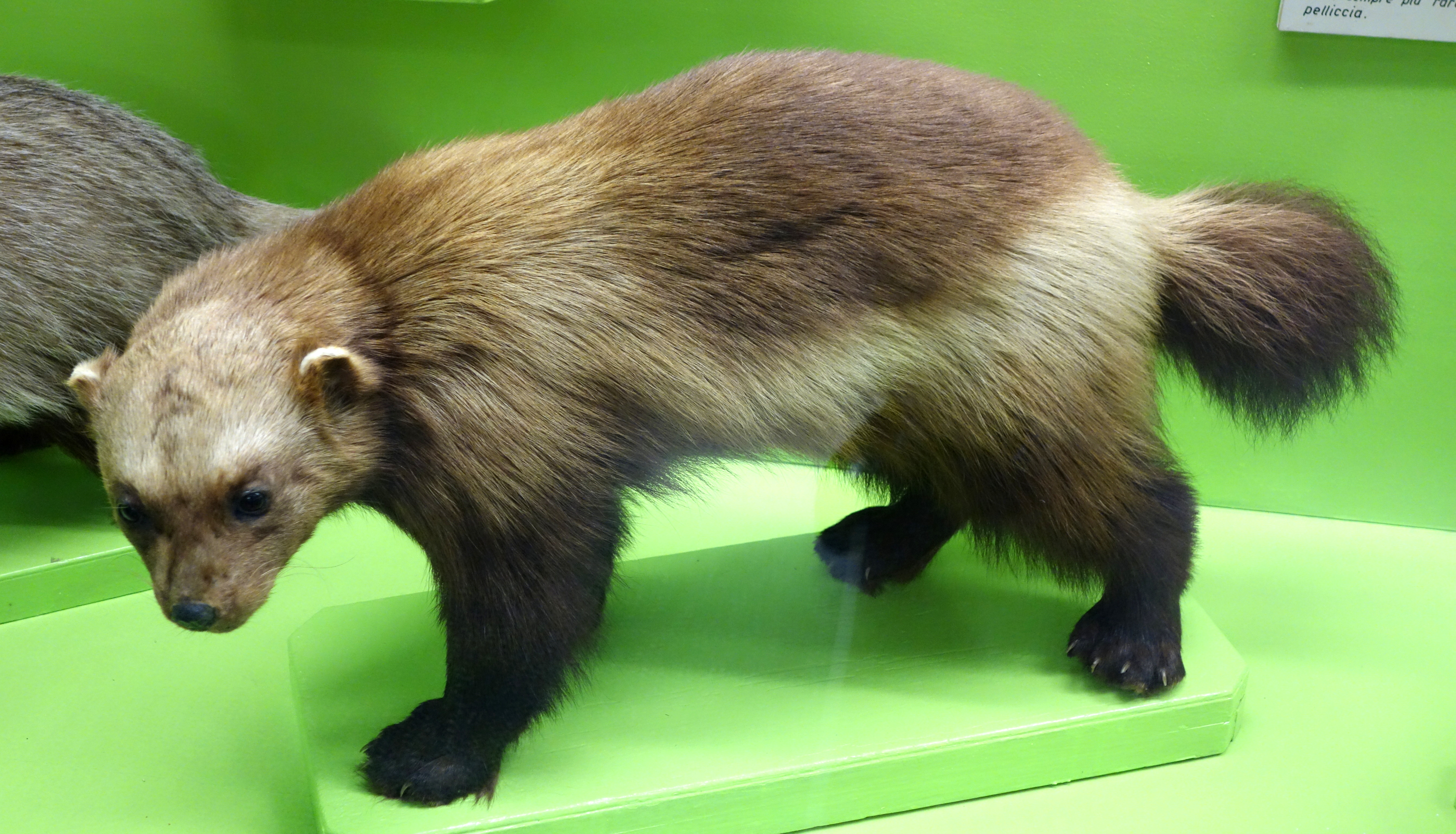
Stuffed individual at the Museo Civico di Storia Naturale Giacomo Doria, Italy

Genetic evidence suggests that the wolverine is most closely related to the tayra and martens, all of which shared a Eurasian ancestor.

There are two subspecies: the Old World form, Gulo gulo gulo, and the New World form, G. g. luscus. Some authors had described as many as four additional North American subspecies, including ones limited to Vancouver Island (G. g. vancouverensis) and the Kenai Peninsula in Alaska (G. g. katschemakensis). However, the most accepted taxonomy recognizes either the two continental subspecies or G. gulo as a single Holarctic taxon.

=== Evolution ===
Recently compiled genetic evidence suggests most of North America's wolverines are descended from a single source, likely originating from Beringia during the last glaciation and rapidly expanding thereafter, though considerable uncertainty to this conclusion is due to the difficulty of collecting samples in the extremely depleted southern extent of the range.

== Physical characteristics ==
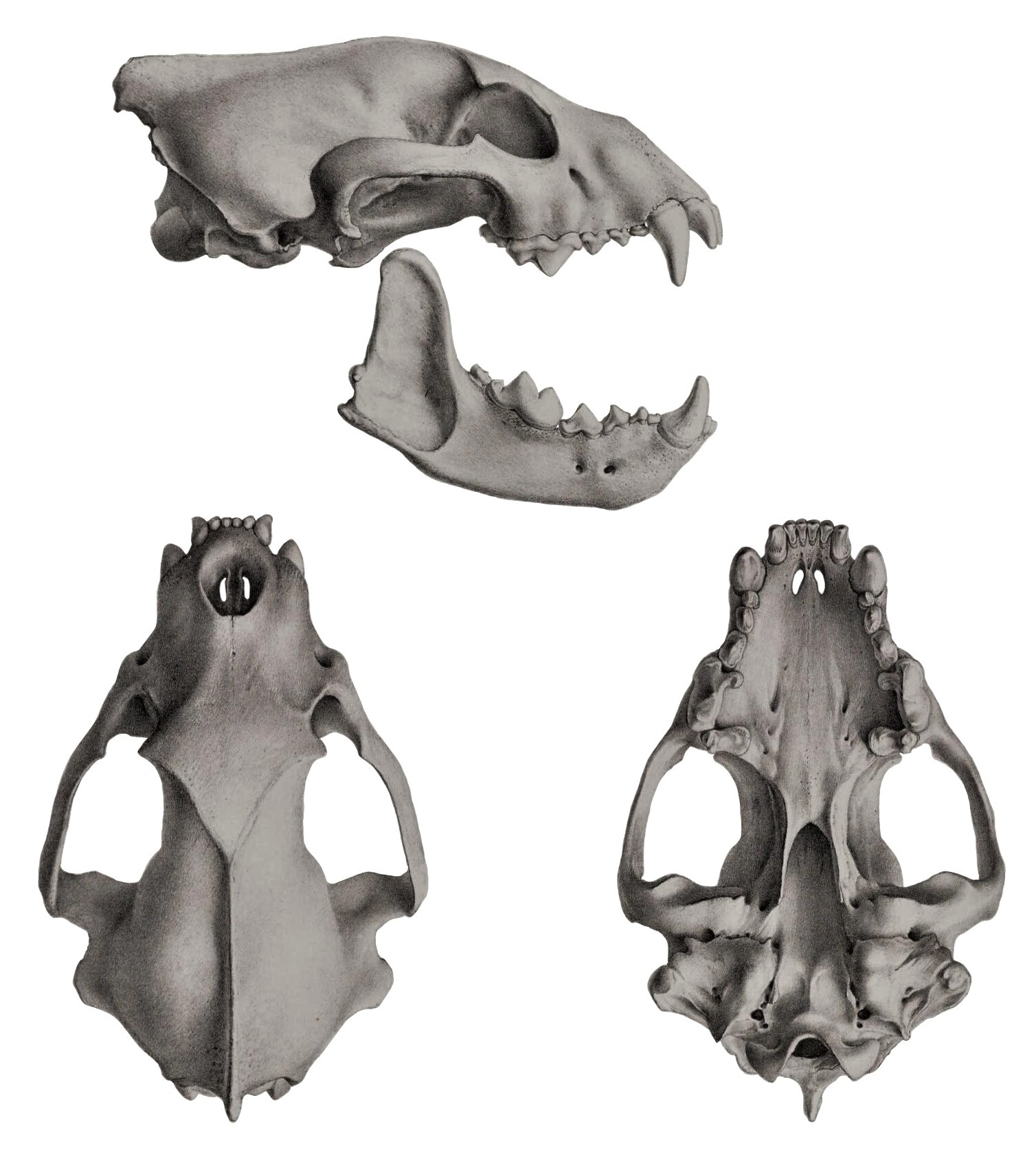
Skull

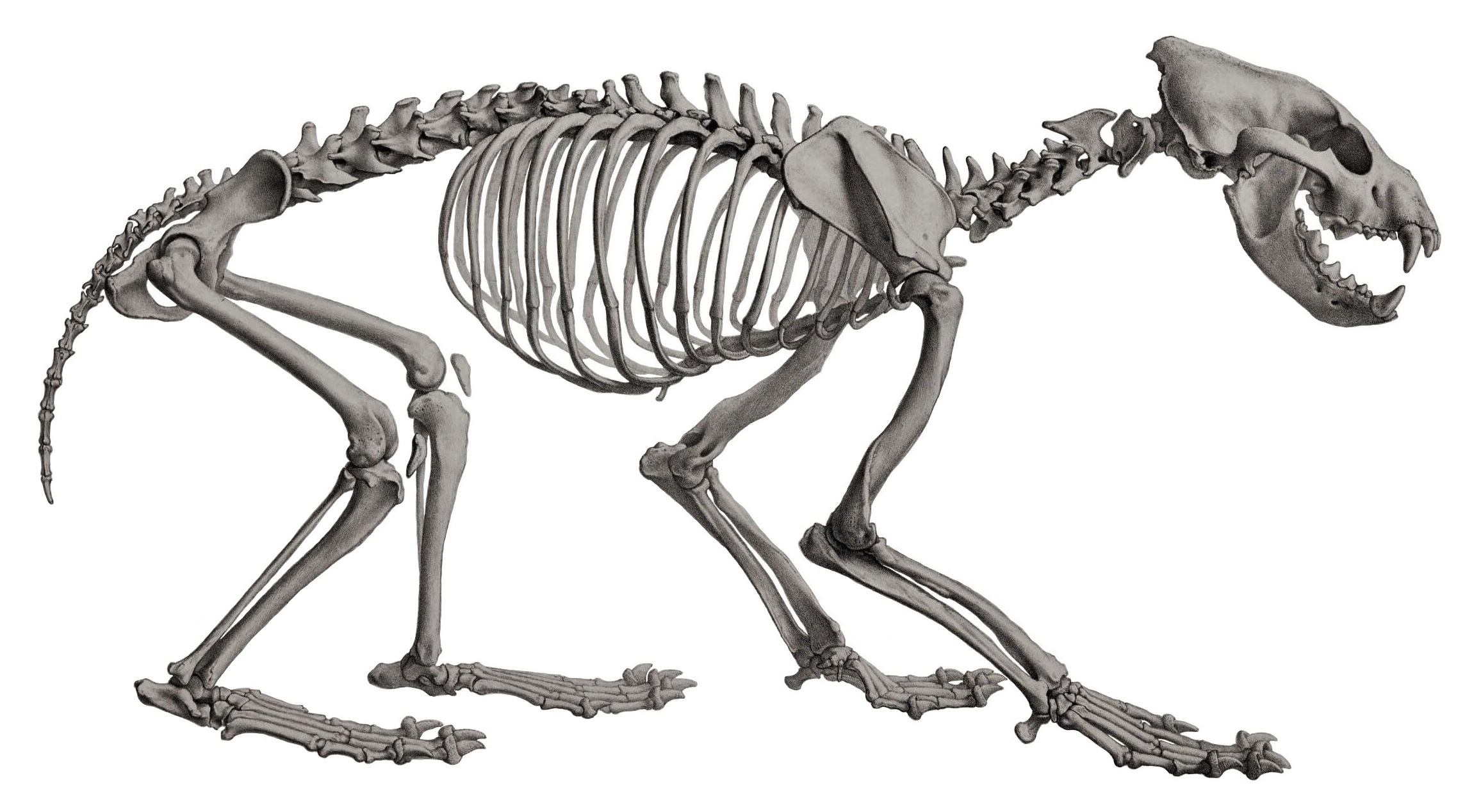
Skeleton

Anatomically, the wolverine is an elongated animal that is low to the ground. With strong limbs, broad and rounded head, small eyes and short rounded ears, it most closely resembles a large fisher. Though its legs are short, its large, five-toed paws with crampon-like claws and plantigrade posture enable it to climb up and over steep cliffs, trees and snow-covered peaks with relative ease.

The adult wolverine is about the size of a medium dog, with a body length ranging from 65–109 cm (26–43 in); standing 36–45 cm (14–18 in) at the shoulder; and a tail length of 17–26 cm (6 1/2–10 in). Weight is usually 11–18 kg (24–40 lb) in males, and in females 8–12 kg (18–26 lb). Exceptionally large males of as much as 32 kg (71 lb) are referenced in Soviet literature, though such weights are deemed in Mammals of the Soviet Union to be improbable. The males are often 10–15% larger than the females in linear measurements and can be 30–40% greater in weight. According to some sources, Eurasian wolverines are claimed to be larger and heavier than those in North America, with weights of up to 20 kg (44 lb). However, this may refer more specifically to areas such as Siberia, as data from Fennoscandian wolverines shows they are typically around the same size as their American counterparts. It is the largest of terrestrial mustelids; only the marine-dwelling sea otter, the giant otter of the Amazon basin and the semi-aquatic African clawless otter are larger—while the European badger may reach a similar body mass, especially in autumn.

Wolverines have thick, dark, oily fur which is highly hydrophobic, making it resistant to frost. This has led to its traditional popularity among hunters and trappers as a lining in jackets and parkas in Arctic conditions. A light-silvery facial mask is distinct in some individuals, and a pale buff stripe runs laterally from the shoulders along the side and crossing the rump just above a 25–35 cm (10–14 in) bushy tail. Some individuals display prominent white hair patches on their throats or chests.

Like many other mustelids, it has potent anal scent glands used for marking territory and sexual signaling. The pungent odor has given rise to the nicknames "skunk bear" and "nasty cat." The anal gland secretion for the samples obtained from six animal's secretion was complex and variable: 123 compounds were detected in total, with the number per animal ranging from 45 to 71 compounds. Only six compounds were common to all extracts: 3-methylbutanoic acid, 2-methylbutanoic acid, phenylacetic acid, alpha-tocopherol, cholesterol, and a compound tentatively identified as 2-methyldecanoic acid. The highly odoriferous thietanes and dithiolanes found in anal gland secretions of some members of the Mustelinae [ferrets, mink, stoats, and weasels (Mustela spp.) and zorillas (Ictonyx spp.)] were not observed. The composition of the wolverine's anal gland secretion is similar to that of two other members of the Mustelinae, the pine and beech marten (Martes spp.)

Wolverines, like other mustelids, possess a special upper molar in the back of the mouth that is rotated 90 degrees, towards the inside of the mouth. This special characteristic allows wolverines to tear off meat from prey or carrion that has been frozen solid.

Wolverines have the highest compressive strength per trabecular bone volumetric fraction (A 10mm high × 5mm diameter cylinder) at the mandibular condyle among all carnivore mammals at 940.8 Newtons, followed by the cheetah at 784.4 Newtons, the Malagasy civet at 714.4 Newtons, the honey badger at 710.8 Newtons and the kinkajou at 693.2 Newtons.

== Distribution ==
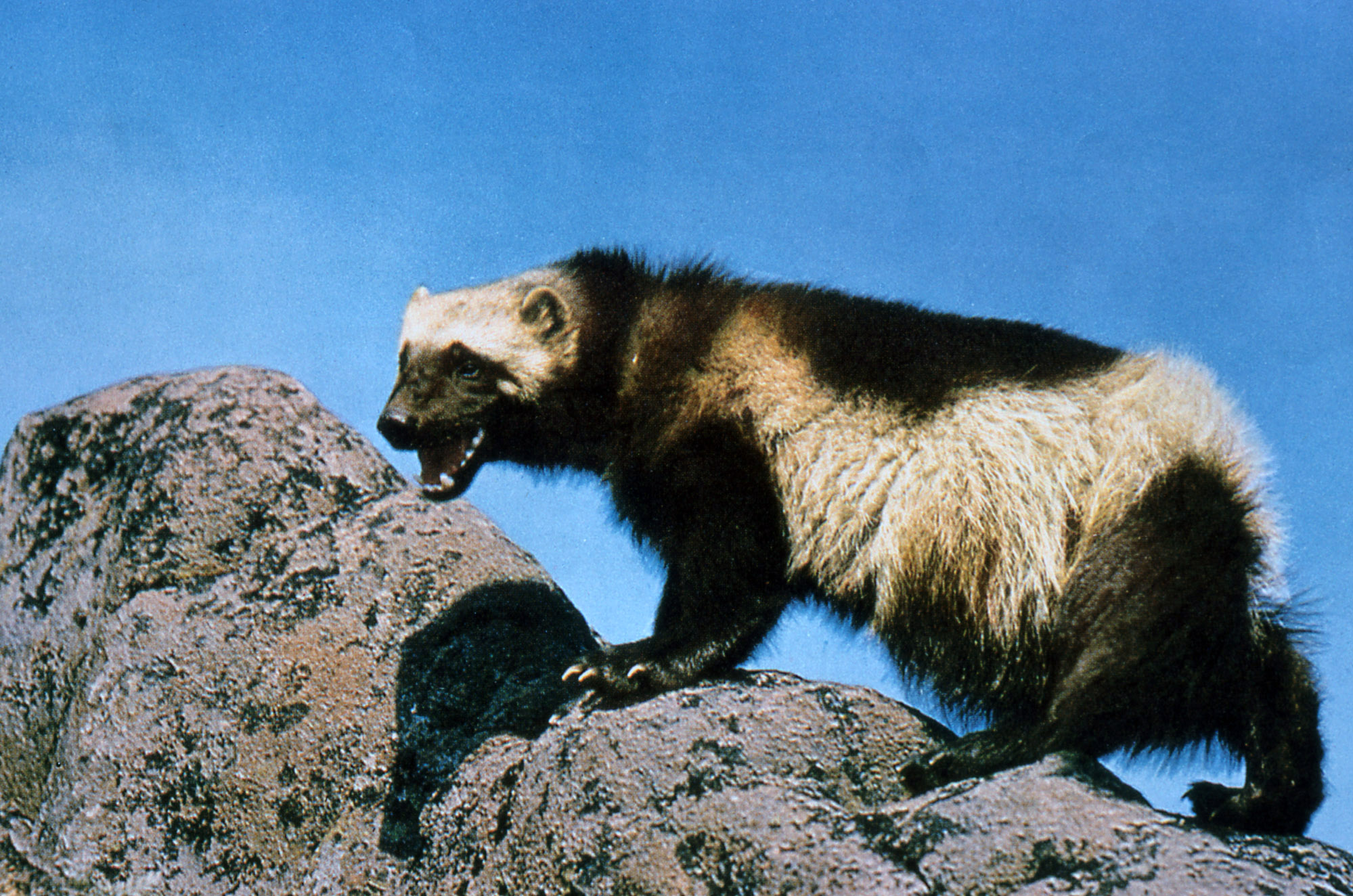
Wolverine on rocky terrain

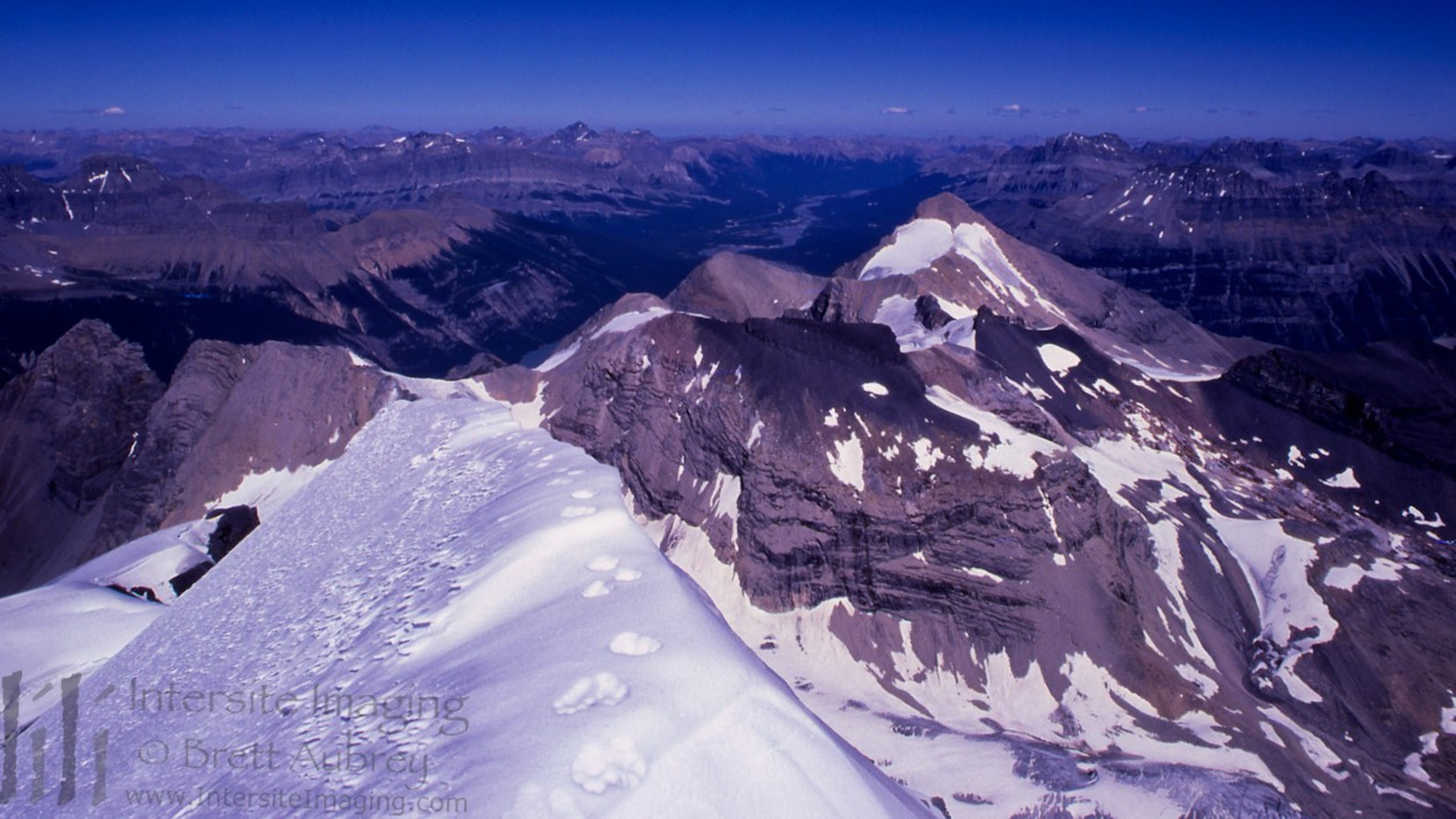
Wolverine tracks on Mt. Forbes

Wolverines live primarily in isolated arctic, boreal, and alpine regions of northern Canada, Alaska, Siberia, and Fennoscandia; they are also native to European Russia, the Russian Far East, northeast China and Mongolia.

Wolverine remains have been found in Ukraine, but they were extirpated and it is unclear whether the wolverines would have formed sustainable populations.

The species was present in Scotland until 6,000 BC.

Unique records of encounters with wolverines have been noted in Latvia, the most recent one being in late July 2022 (although it can be disputed because of the unclear footage); the population was widespread in the 16th and 17th centuries, but it is no longer native to the area.

Most New World wolverines live in Canada and Alaska. However, wolverines were once recorded as also being present in Colorado, areas of the southwestern United States (Arizona and New Mexico); the Midwest (Indiana, Nebraska, North and South Dakota, Ohio, Minnesota, and Wisconsin); New England (Maine, New Hampshire, Vermont, and Massachusetts); and in New York and Pennsylvania.

In the Sierra Nevada, wolverines were sighted near Winnemucca Lake in spring 1995 and at Toe Jam Lake north of the Yosemite border in 1996; and later photographed by baited cameras, including in 2008 and 2009, near Lake Tahoe. According to a 2014 U.S. Fish and Wildlife Service publication, "wolverines are found in the North Cascades in Washington and the Northern Rocky Mountains in Idaho, Montana, Oregon (Wallowa Range), and Wyoming. Individual wolverines have also moved into historic range in the Sierra Nevada Mountains of California and the Southern Rocky Mountains of Colorado, but have not established breeding populations in these areas". In 2022, Colorado Parks and Wildlife considered plans to reintroduce the wolverine to the state.

Wolverines are also found in Utah but are very rarely seen, with only six confirmed sightings since the first confirmed sighting in 1979. Three of these six confirmed Utah sightings have been caught on video. A wolverine, a male, was finally captured and tagged in Utah in 2022 before being released back into the wild to better understand the animal's range.

In August 2020, the National Park Service reported that wolverines had been sighted at Mount Rainier, Washington, for the first time in more than a century. The sighting was of a reproductive female and her two offspring.

In 2004, the first confirmed sighting of a wolverine in Michigan since the early 19th century took place when a Michigan Department of Natural Resources wildlife biologist photographed a wolverine in Ubly, Michigan. The specimen was found dead at the Minden City State Game Area in Sanilac County, Michigan, in 2010.

== Behavior and ecology ==
Video of a wolverine in the Korkeasaari Zoo of Helsinki

=== Diet and hunting ===
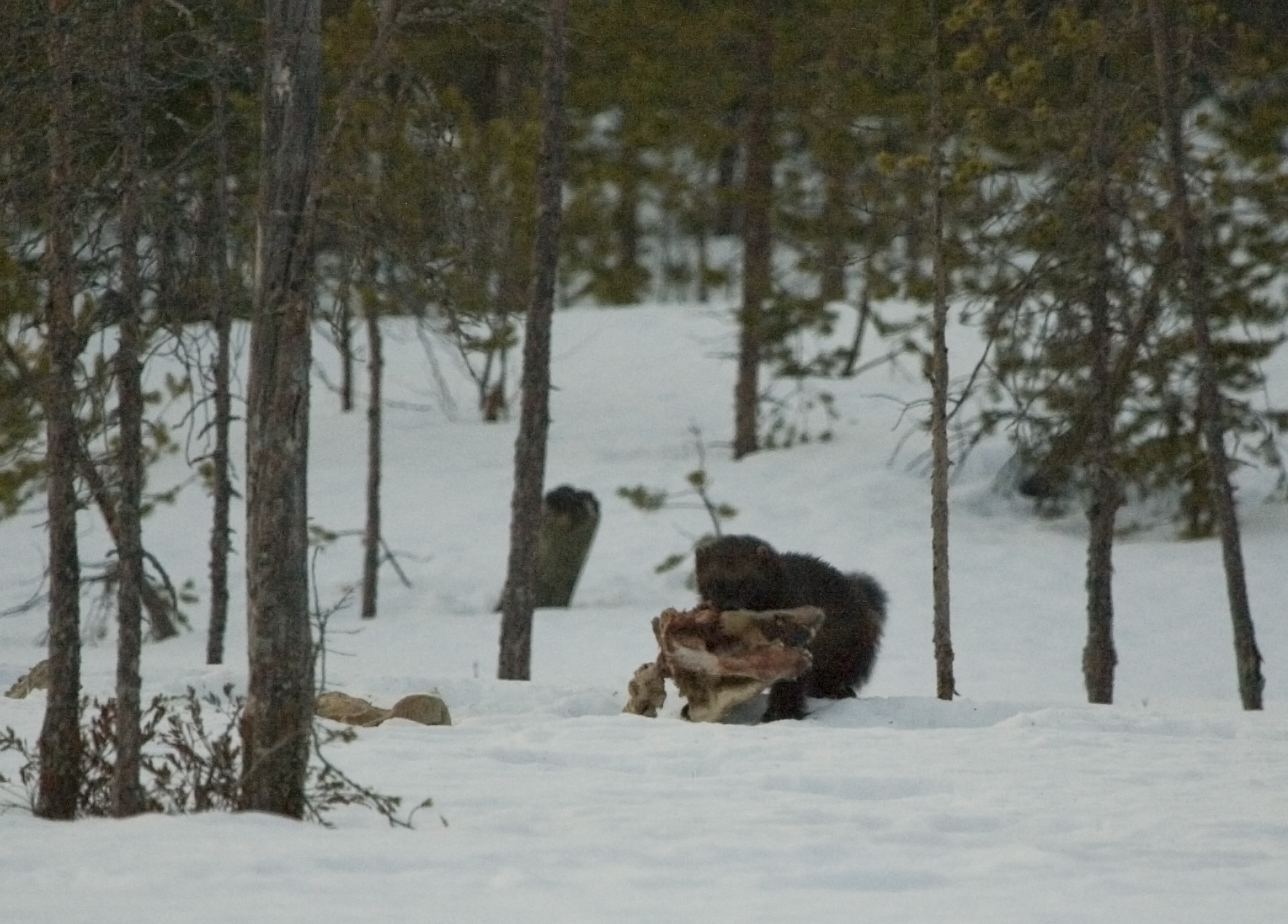
Wolverine with prey in Finland

Wolverines are primarily scavengers. Most of their food is carrion, especially in winter and early spring. They may find carrion themselves, feed on it after the predator (often, a wolf pack) has finished, or simply take it from another predator. Wolverines are known to follow wolf and lynx trails to scavenge the remains of their kills. Whether eating live prey or carrion, the wolverine's feeding style appears voracious, leading to the nickname of "glutton" (also the basis of the scientific name). However, this feeding style is believed to be an adaptation to food scarcity, especially in winter.

The wolverine is also a powerful and versatile predator. Its prey mainly consists of small to medium-sized mammals, but wolverines have been recorded killing prey many times larger than themselves, such as adult deer. Prey species include porcupines, squirrels, chipmunks, beavers, marmots, moles, gophers, rabbits, voles, mice, rats, shrews, lemmings, caribou, roe deer, white-tailed deer, mule deer, sheep, goats, cattle, bison, moose, and elk. Smaller predators are occasionally preyed on, including martens, mink, foxes, Eurasian lynx, weasels, coyote, and wolf pups. Wolverines have also been known to kill Canada lynx in the Yukon of Canada. Wolverines often pursue live prey that are relatively easy to obtain, including animals caught in traps, newborn mammals, and deer (including adult moose and elk) when they are weakened by winter or immobilized by heavy snow. Their diets are sometimes supplemented by birds' eggs, birds (especially geese), roots, seeds, insect larvae, and berries. Adult wolverines appear to be one of the few mammalian carnivores to pose an active threat to golden eagles. Wolverines were observed to prey on nestling golden eagles in Denali National Park. During incubation in Northern Sweden, an incubating adult golden eagle was killed in its nest by a wolverine.

Wolverines inhabiting the Old World (specifically, Fennoscandia) hunt more actively than their North American relatives. This may be because competing predator populations in Eurasia are less dense, making it more practical for the wolverine to hunt for itself than to wait for another animal to make a kill and then try to snatch it. They often feed on carrion left by wolves, so changes in wolf populations may affect the population of wolverines. They are also known on occasion to eat plant material.

Wolverines often cache their food during times of plenty. This is of particular importance to lactating females in the winter and early spring, a time when food is scarce.

=== Reproduction ===
Wolverines are induced ovulators. Successful males will form lifetime relationships with two or three females, which they will visit occasionally, while other males are left without a mate. Mating season is in the summer, but the actual implantation of the embryo (blastocyst) in the uterus is stayed until early winter, delaying the development of the fetus. Females will often not produce young if food is scarce. The gestation period is 30–50 days, and litters of typically two or three young ("kits") are born in the spring. Kits develop rapidly, reaching adult size within the first year. The typical longevity of a wolverine in captivity is around 15 to 17 years, but in the wild the average lifespan is more likely between 8 and 10 years. Fathers make visits to their offspring until they are weaned at 10 weeks of age; also, once the young are about six months old, some reconnect with their fathers and travel together for a time.

=== Interspecies interactions ===
Wolves, American black bears, brown bears and cougars are capable of killing adult wolverines, while smaller predators (like golden eagles) can kill young and inexperienced individuals. Wolves are thought to be the wolverine's most important natural predator, with the arrival of wolves to a wolverine's territory presumably leading the latter to abandon the area. Armed with powerful jaws, sharp claws, and a thick hide, wolverines, like most mustelids, are remarkably strong for their size. They may defend against larger or more numerous predators such as wolves or bears. By far, their most serious predator is the grey wolf, with an extensive record of wolverine fatalities attributed to wolves in both North America and Eurasia. It has been reported that packs of grey wolves occasionally kill wolverines, either to defend their kills or to protect dens containing their own pups. In North America, another (less frequent) predator is the cougar. At least one account reported a wolverine's apparent attempt to steal a kill from a black bear, although the bear won what was ultimately a fatal contest for the wolverine. There are a few accounts of brown bears killing and consuming wolverines as well and, although also reported at times to be chased off prey, in some areas such as Denali National Park, wolverines seemed to try to actively avoid encounters with grizzly bears as they have been reported in areas where wolves start hunting them.

=== Urine scent marking ===
Wolverines have been observed to use urine as a scent-marking behavior. Headspace analysis of the volatiles emanating from urine samples identified 19 potential semiochemicals. The major classes of identified chemicals are the ketones: 2-heptanone, 4-heptanone and 4-nonanone and the monoterpenes: alpha-pinene, beta-pinene, limonene, linalool and geraniol. In other mammals, the excretion of these terpenes is unusual. The conifer needles that are found in wolverine scat are likely the source of these monoterpenes.

== Threats and conservation ==
The world's total wolverine population is not known. The animal exhibits a low population density and requires a very large home range. The wolverine is listed by the IUCN as Least Concern because of its "wide distribution, remaining large populations, and the unlikelihood that it is in decline at a rate fast enough to trigger even Near Threatened".

The range of a male wolverine can be more than 620 km^{2} (240 sq mi), encompassing the ranges of several females which have smaller home ranges of roughly 130–260 km^{2} (50–100 mi^{2}). Adult wolverines try for the most part to keep nonoverlapping ranges with adults of the same sex. Radio tracking suggests an animal can range hundreds of miles in a few months.

Female wolverines burrow into snow in February to create a den, which is used until weaning in mid-May. Areas inhabited nonseasonally by wolverines are thus restricted to zones with late-spring snowmelts. This fact has led to concern that global warming will shrink the ranges of wolverine populations.

This requirement for large territories brings wolverines into conflict with human development, and hunting and trapping further reduce their numbers, causing them to disappear from large parts of their former range; attempts to have them declared an endangered species have met with little success. In February 2013, the United States Fish and Wildlife Service proposed giving Endangered Species Act protections to the wolverine due to its winter habitat in the northern Rockies diminishing. This was as a result of a lawsuit brought by the Center for Biological Diversity and Defenders of Wildlife. In November 2023, the United States Fish and Wildlife Service announced that it was adding the wolverine in the United States Lower 48 states to the threatened list.

The Wildlife Conservation Society reported in June 2009 that a wolverine researchers had been tracking for almost three months had crossed into northern Colorado. Society officials had tagged the young male wolverine in Wyoming near Grand Teton National Park, and it had traveled southward for about 500 miles (800 km). It was the first wolverine seen in Colorado since 1919, and its appearance was also confirmed by the Colorado Division of Wildlife. In May 2016 the same wolverine was killed by a cattle ranch-hand in North Dakota, ending a greater-than-800-mile (1,300 km) trip by this lone male wolverine, dubbed M-56. This was the first verified sighting of a wolverine in North Dakota in 150 years. In February 2014, a wolverine was seen in Utah, the first confirmed sighting in that state in 30 years.

In 2024, Colorado's state government passed a bill authorizing the reintroduction of wolverines into the state. As of February 2026, Colorado Parks and Wildlife plans to release 15 wolverines annually over the course of three years. This will be the first attempt to reintroduce wolverines to a region where they have been extirpated.

Country	Population in surveyed area	Surveyed area	Year	State of population
Sweden	265+	Norrbotten	1995–97	Stable
Norway	150+	Snøhetta plateau and North	1995–97	Decline
Norway and Sweden – overall	1065	Overall	2012	Increase
Finland	155–170	Karelia and North	2008	Stable
Finland – overall	165–175	Overall	2012	Increase
Russia	1500	European Russia	1970, 1990,	Decline
Russia – Komi	885	–	1990	–
Russia – Archangelsk Oblast	410	Nenetsky Autonomous Area	1990	Limited
Russia – Kola Peninsula	160	Hunting Districts	1990	Decline
United States – Alaska	Unknown	Kobuk Valley National Park, Selawik National Wildlife Refuge	1998	Decline
United States – Alaska	3.0 (± 0.4 SE) wolverines/1,000 km^{2}	Turnagain Arm and the Kenai Mountains	2004	–
United States – Rocky Mountains	28–52	Montana, Idaho, Wyoming	1989–2020	Unknown
United States – California	3	Tahoe National Forest	2008	Unknown
Canada – Yukon	9.7 (± 0.6 SE) wolverines/1,000 km^{2}	Old Crow Flats	2004	–
Canada – Ontario	Unclear	Red Lake – Sioux Lookout to Fort Severn – Peawanuck	2004	Stable to expanding
Canada – overall	15,000–19,000	Overall	–	Stable

=== In captivity ===
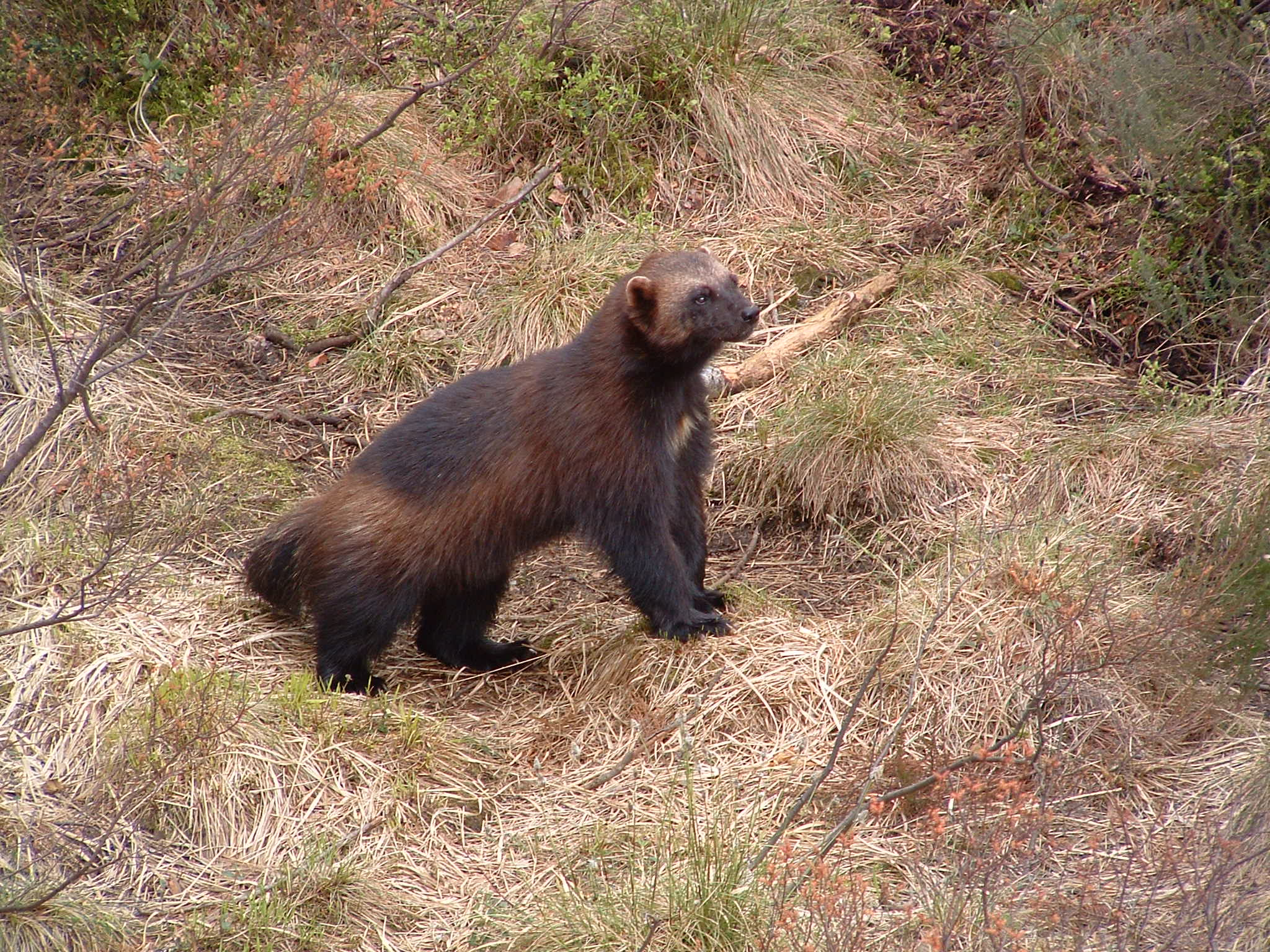
Captive at the Kristiansand Zoo, Norway

Around a hundred wolverines are held in zoos across North America and Europe, and they have been bred in captivity, but only with difficulty and high infant mortality.

== Human interactions ==
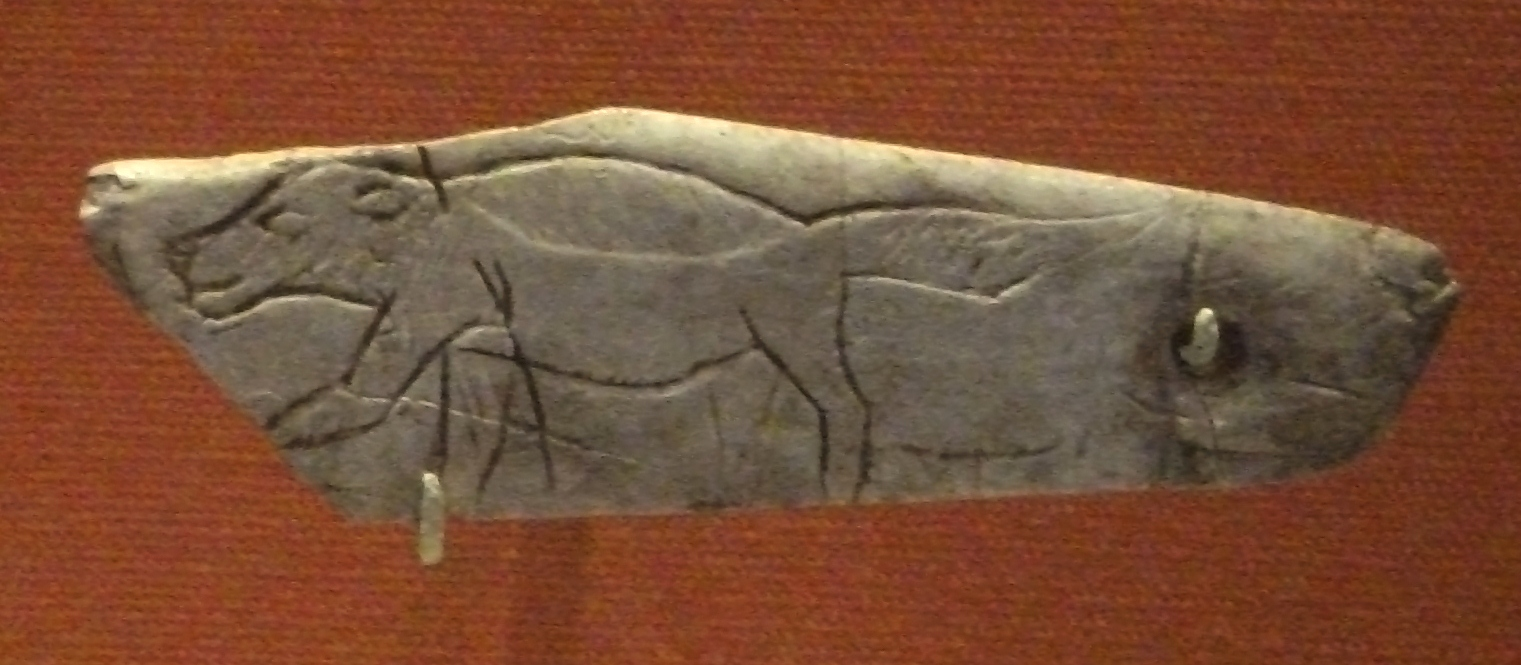
The Wolverine pendant of Les Eyzies, when wolverines were still found in southern France

A wolverine in the coat of arms of the Kittilä municipality

Many North American cities, sports teams, and organizations use the wolverine as a mascot. For example, the US state of Michigan is, by tradition, known as "the Wolverine State", and the University of Michigan takes the animal as its mascot. There have also been professional baseball and football clubs called the "Wolverines". The association is well and long established: for example, many Detroiters volunteered to fight during the American Civil War and George Armstrong Custer, who led the Michigan Brigade, called them the "Wolverines". The origins of this association are obscure; it may derive from a busy trade in wolverine furs in Sault Ste. Marie in the 18th century or may recall a disparagement intended to compare early settlers in Michigan with the vicious mammal. Wolverines are, however, extremely rare in Michigan. A sighting in February 2004 near Ubly was the first confirmed sighting in Michigan in 200 years. The animal was found dead in 2010.

The Marvel Comics superhero James "Logan" Howlett was given the nickname "Wolverine" while cage fighting because of his skill, short stature, keen animal senses, ferocity, and most notably, claws that retract from both sets of knuckles.

The wolverine is prevalent in stories and oral history from various Algonquian tribes and figures prominently in the mythology of the Innu people of eastern Quebec and Labrador. The wolverine is known as Kuekuatsheu, a conniving trickster who created the world. The story of the formation of the Innu world begins long ago when Kuekuatsheu built a big boat similar to Noah's Ark and put all the various animal species in it. There was a great deal of rain, and the land was flooded. Kuekuatsheu told a mink to dive into the water to retrieve some mud and rocks which he mixed together to create an island, which is the world that is presently inhabited along with all the animals. Many tales of Kuekuatsheu are often humorous and irreverent and include crude references to bodily functions. Some Northeastern tribes, such as the Miꞌkmaq and Passamaquoddy, refer to the wolverine as Lox, who usually appears in tales as a trickster and thief (although generally more dangerous than its Innu counterpart) and is often depicted as a companion to the wolf. Similarly, the Dené, a group of the Athabaskan-speaking natives of northwestern Canada, have many stories of the wolverine as a trickster and cultural transformer much like the coyote in the Navajo tradition or raven in Northwest Coast traditions.
