= Jamnica, Podkarpackie Voivodeship =

Jamnica
- Village
- Location within Poland
- Coordinates: 50°35′N 21°55′E
- Country: Poland
- Voivodeship: Subcarpathian
- County: Tarnobrzeg
- Gmina: Grębów

Jamnica [jamˈɲit͡sa] is a village in the administrative district of Gmina Grębów, within Tarnobrzeg County, Subcarpathian Voivodeship, in south-eastern Poland.
