= Zalesie Gorzyckie =

- Village
- Location within Poland
- Coordinates: 50°41′N 21°49′E
- Country: Poland
- Voivodeship: Subcarpathian
- County: Tarnobrzeg
- Gmina: Gorzyce

Zalesie Gorzyckie [zaˈlɛɕɛ ɡɔˈʐɨt͡skʲɛ] is a village in the administrative district of Gmina Gorzyce, within Tarnobrzeg County, Subcarpathian Voivodeship, in south-eastern Poland.
