= Szlachecka, Podkarpackie Voivodeship =

Szlachecka
- Village
- Location within Poland
- Coordinates: 50°33′41″N 21°52′9″E
- Country: Poland
- Voivodeship: Subcarpathian
- County: Tarnobrzeg
- Gmina: Grębów

Szlachecka [ʂlaˈxɛt͡ska] is a village in the administrative district of Gmina Grębów, within Tarnobrzeg County, Subcarpathian Voivodeship, in south-eastern Poland.
