= Niwa, Tarnobrzeg County =

Niwa
- Village
- Location within Poland
- Coordinates: 50°33′30″N 21°53′34″E
- Country: Poland
- Voivodeship: Subcarpathian
- County: Tarnobrzeg
- Gmina: Grębów

Niwa [ˈɲiva] is a village in the administrative district of Gmina Grębów, within Tarnobrzeg County, Subcarpathian Voivodeship, in south-eastern Poland.
