= Kaczaki =

- Village
- Location within Poland
- Coordinates: 50°27′29″N 21°39′50″E
- Country: Poland
- Voivodeship: Subcarpathian
- County: Tarnobrzeg
- Gmina: Baranów Sandomierski

Kaczaki [kaˈt͡ʂakʲi] is a village in the administrative district of Gmina Baranów Sandomierski, within Tarnobrzeg County, Subcarpathian Voivodeship, in south-eastern Poland.
