= Jean Palluch =

French footballer (1923–1991)

Personal information
- Full name: Jan Palluch
- Date of birth: 23 December 1923
- Place of birth: Jadachy, Poland
- Date of death: 17 February 1991 (aged 67)
- Place of death: Saint-Gaudens, Haute-Garonne

Senior career*
Years	Team	Apps	(Gls)
- SA Sézanne
1946	AS Saint-Dizier		
1946–1950	Reims	57	(26)
1950–1951	Le Havre	35	(10)
1951–1952	Rouen	36	(29)
1952–1953	Monaco	35	(25)
1953	Lyon	18	(6)
1953–1958	Marseille	131	(8)
1958–1959	AS Saint-Dizier		
1959–1960	Olympique d'Hussein-Dey		

International career
1948	France Olympic	2	(0)

Managerial career
- 1958–1959: AS Saint-Dizier
- 1960–1961: Olympique d'Hussein-Dey
- * Club domestic league appearances and goals

Jan "Jean" Palluch (23 December 1923 – 17 February 1991) sometimes spelled Paluch, was a French footballer. He competed in the men's tournament at the 1948 Summer Olympics.

== Club career ==
Palluch started his career at AS Saint-Dizier. He then went to Reims in 1946. He became France’s champion with them in 1948–49.

He played for Le Havre in one season, 1950–51. In 1951–52 he played for Rouen. He played for Monaco in 1952–53.

He played for Lyon for six months, from July to December 1953.

In January 1954, he went to Marseille where he stayed four years.

In 1958 he returned to AS Saint-Dizier for one season.

He ended his career in 1959–60 at Olympique d'Hussein-Dey.

== International career ==
Palluch was selected in France Football squad for the 1948 Summer Olympics, and played France two Games against India and Great Britain, as France were eliminated in the Quarterfinals. He never had a cap with France senior team.

== Managerial career ==
In 1959–1960 Palluch coached AS Saint-Dizier while he was still a player there.

In 1960–1961 he coached Olympique d'Hussein-Dey

== Honours ==
Reims

- Ligue 1: 1948-49
