= Palędzie, Podkarpackie Voivodeship =

Palędzie
- Village
- Location within Poland
- Coordinates: 50°33′44″N 21°53′1″E
- Country: Poland
- Voivodeship: Subcarpathian
- County: Tarnobrzeg
- Gmina: Grębów

Palędzie [paˈlɛnd͡ʑɛ] is a village in the administrative district of Gmina Grębów, within Tarnobrzeg County, Subcarpathian Voivodeship, in south-eastern Poland.
