= Skopanie =

- Village
- Location within Poland
- Coordinates: 50°28′N 21°34′E
- Country: Poland
- Voivodeship: Subcarpathian
- County: Tarnobrzeg
- Gmina: Baranów Sandomierski
- Population: 2,796
- Website: http://www.skopanie.pl

Skopanie [skɔˈpaɲɛ] is a village in the administrative district of Gmina Baranów Sandomierski, within Tarnobrzeg County, Subcarpathian Voivodeship, in south-eastern Poland.
