= Tarnowska Wola, Podkarpackie Voivodeship =

Tarnowska Wola
- Village
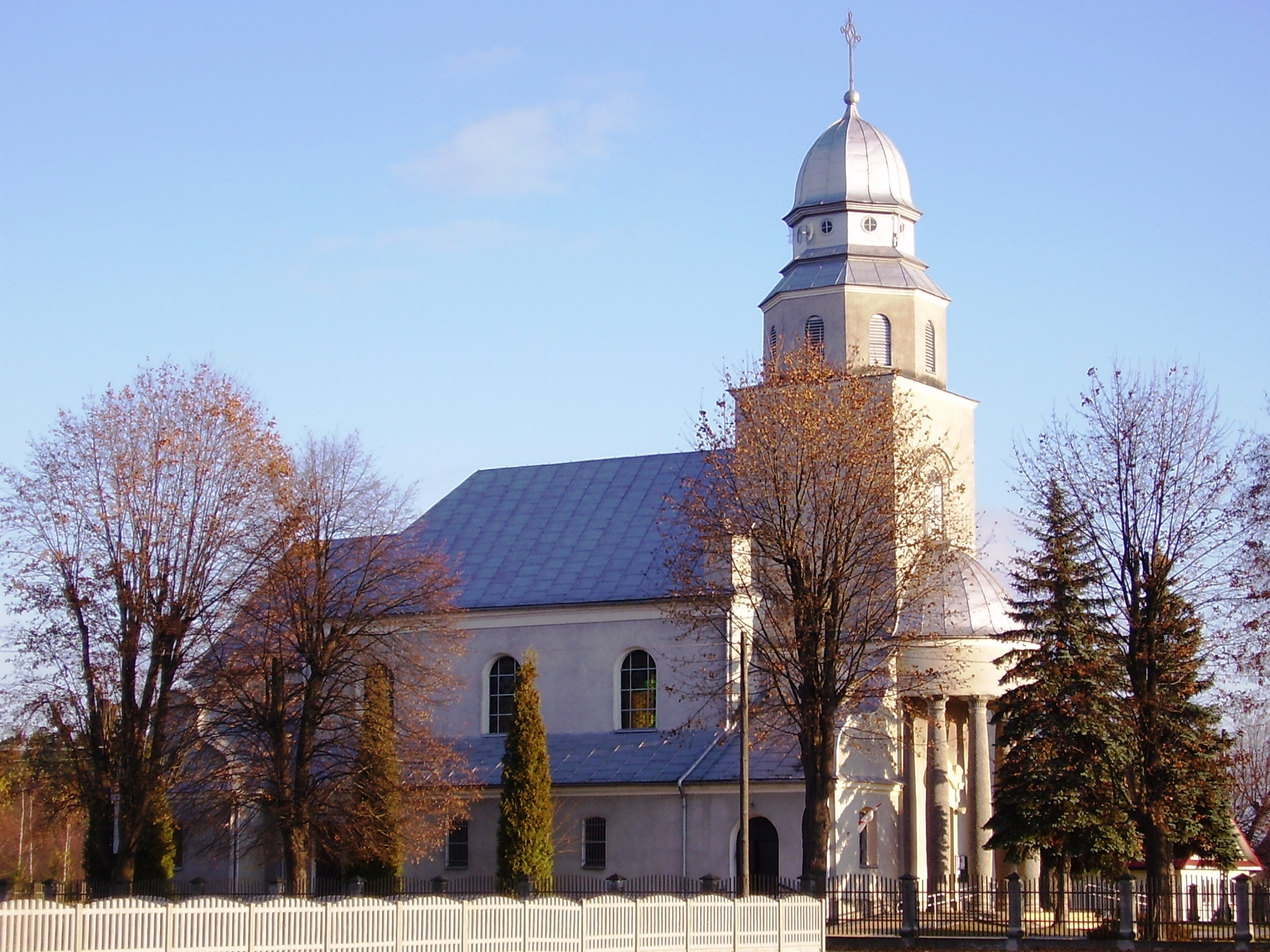
- Church of the Sacred Heart

- Location within Poland
- Coordinates: 50°27′N 21°45′E
- Country: Poland
- Voivodeship: Subcarpathian
- County: Tarnobrzeg
- Gmina: Nowa Dęba
- Time zone: UTC+1 (CET)
  - Summer (DST): UTC+2 (CEST)
- Vehicle registration: RTA

Tarnowska Wola [tarˈnɔfska ˈvɔla] is a village in the administrative district of Gmina Nowa Dęba, within Tarnobrzeg County, Subcarpathian Voivodeship, in south-eastern Poland.

Four Polish citizens were murdered by Nazi Germany in the village during World War II.
