= Grębów, Podkarpackie Voivodeship =

Grębów
- Village
- Location within Poland
- Coordinates: 50°34′N 21°52′E
- Country: Poland
- Voivodeship: Subcarpathian
- County: Tarnobrzeg
- Gmina: Grębów
- Population: 3,000

Grębów [ˈɡrɛmbuf] is a village in Tarnobrzeg County, Subcarpathian Voivodeship, in south-eastern Poland. It is the seat of the gmina (administrative district) called Gmina Grębów. It is a railroad junction of secondary importance, with lines stemming into three directions - northwest towards Sandomierz, west towards Sobów, and east, towards Stalowa Wola - Rozwadów.
