= Gmina Baranów Sandomierski =

Gmina Baranów Sandomierski Baranów Sandomierski Commune
- Gmina
- Coat of arms
- Interactive map of Gmina Baranów Sandomierski
- Coordinates (Baranów Sandomierski): 50°30′N 21°32′E
- Country: Poland
- Voivodeship: Subcarpathian
- County: Tarnobrzeg County
- Seat: Baranów Sandomierski

Area
  - Total: 121.86 km^{2} (47.05 sq mi)

Population (2006)
  - Total: 11,977
  - Density: 98.285/km^{2} (254.56/sq mi)
  - Urban: 1,453
  - Rural: 10,524
- Website: http://www.baranowsandomierski.pl/

Gmina Baranów Sandomierski is an urban-rural gmina (administrative district) in Tarnobrzeg County, Subcarpathian Voivodeship, in south-eastern Poland. Its seat is the town of Baranów Sandomierski, which lies approximately 15 kilometres (9 mi) south-west of Tarnobrzeg and 62 km (39 mi) north-west of the regional capital Rzeszów.

The gmina covers an area of 121.86 square kilometres (47.1 sq mi), and as of 2006 its total population is 11,977, of which the population of Baranów Sandomierski is 1,453, and the population of the rural part of the gmina is 10,524.

== Villages ==
Apart from the town of Baranów Sandomierski, Gmina Baranów Sandomierski contains the villages and settlements of Dąbrowica, Durdy, Dymitrów Duży, Dymitrów Mały, Kaczaki, Knapy, Marki, Siedleszczany, Skopanie, Ślęzaki, Suchorzów and Wola Baranowska.

== Neighbouring gminas ==
Gmina Baranów Sandomierski is bordered by the city of Tarnobrzeg and by the gminas of Cmolas, Łoniów, Majdan Królewski, Nowa Dęba, Osiek, Padew Narodowa and Tuszów Narodowy.

== Bibliography ==
- Polish official population figures 2006
