= Marki, Podkarpackie Voivodeship =

Marki
- Village
- Location within Poland
- Coordinates: 50°26′51″N 21°37′15″E
- Country: Poland
- Voivodeship: Subcarpathian
- County: Tarnobrzeg
- Gmina: Baranów Sandomierski

Marki [ˈmarkʲi] is a village in the administrative district of Gmina Baranów Sandomierski, within Tarnobrzeg County, Subcarpathian Voivodeship, in south-eastern Poland.
