= Alfredówka =

- Village
- Location within Poland
- Coordinates: 50°28′N 21°45′E
- Country: Poland
- Voivodeship: Subcarpathian
- County: Tarnobrzeg
- Gmina: Nowa Dęba
- Population: 750

Alfredówka [alfrɛˈdufka] is a village in the administrative district of Gmina Nowa Dęba, within Tarnobrzeg County, Subcarpathian Voivodeship, in south-eastern Poland.
