= Jadachy =

- Village
- Location within Poland
- Coordinates: 50°29′N 21°41′E
- Country: Poland
- Voivodeship: Subcarpathian
- County: Tarnobrzeg
- Gmina: Nowa Dęba
- Population: 1,600

Jadachy [jaˈdaxɨ] is a village in the administrative district of Gmina Nowa Dęba, within Tarnobrzeg County, Subcarpathian Voivodeship, in south-eastern Poland.
