= Sokół, Podkarpackie Voivodeship =

Sokół
- Village
- Location within Poland
- Coordinates: 50°34′37″N 21°50′2″E
- Country: Poland
- Voivodeship: Subcarpathian
- County: Tarnobrzeg
- Gmina: Grębów

Sokół [ˈsɔkuu̯] is a village in the administrative district of Gmina Grębów, within Tarnobrzeg County, Subcarpathian Voivodeship, in south-eastern Poland.
