= Gmina Nowa Dęba =

Gmina Nowa Dęba Nowa Dęba Commune
- Gmina
- Coat of arms
- Interactive map of Gmina Nowa Dęba
- Coordinates (Nowa Dęba): 50°28′N 21°44′E
- Country: Poland
- Voivodeship: Subcarpathian
- County: Tarnobrzeg County
- Seat: Nowa Dęba

Area
  - Total: 142.52 km^{2} (55.03 sq mi)

Population (2006)
  - Total: 18,422
  - Density: 129.26/km^{2} (334.78/sq mi)
  - Urban: 11,390
  - Rural: 7,032
- Website: http://nowadeba.pl/

Gmina Nowa Dęba is an urban-rural gmina (administrative district) in Tarnobrzeg County, Subcarpathian Voivodeship, in south-eastern Poland. Its seat is the town of Nowa Dęba, which lies approximately 18 kilometres (11 mi) south of the town of Tarnobrzeg and 48 km (30 mi) north of the regional capital Rzeszów.

The gmina covers an area of 142.52 square kilometres (55.0 sq mi), and as of 2006 its total population is 18,422 (out of which the population of Nowa Dęba amounts to 11,390, and the population of the rural part of the gmina is 7,032).

== Villages ==
Apart from the town of Nowa Dęba, Gmina Nowa Dęba contains the villages and settlements of Alfredówka, Chmielów, Cygany, Jadachy, Rozalin and Tarnowska Wola.

== Neighbouring gminas ==
Gmina Nowa Dęba is bordered by the city of Tarnobrzeg and by the gminas of Baranów Sandomierski, Bojanów, Grębów and Majdan Królewski.
