= Gorzyce, Tarnobrzeg County =

Gorzyce
- Village
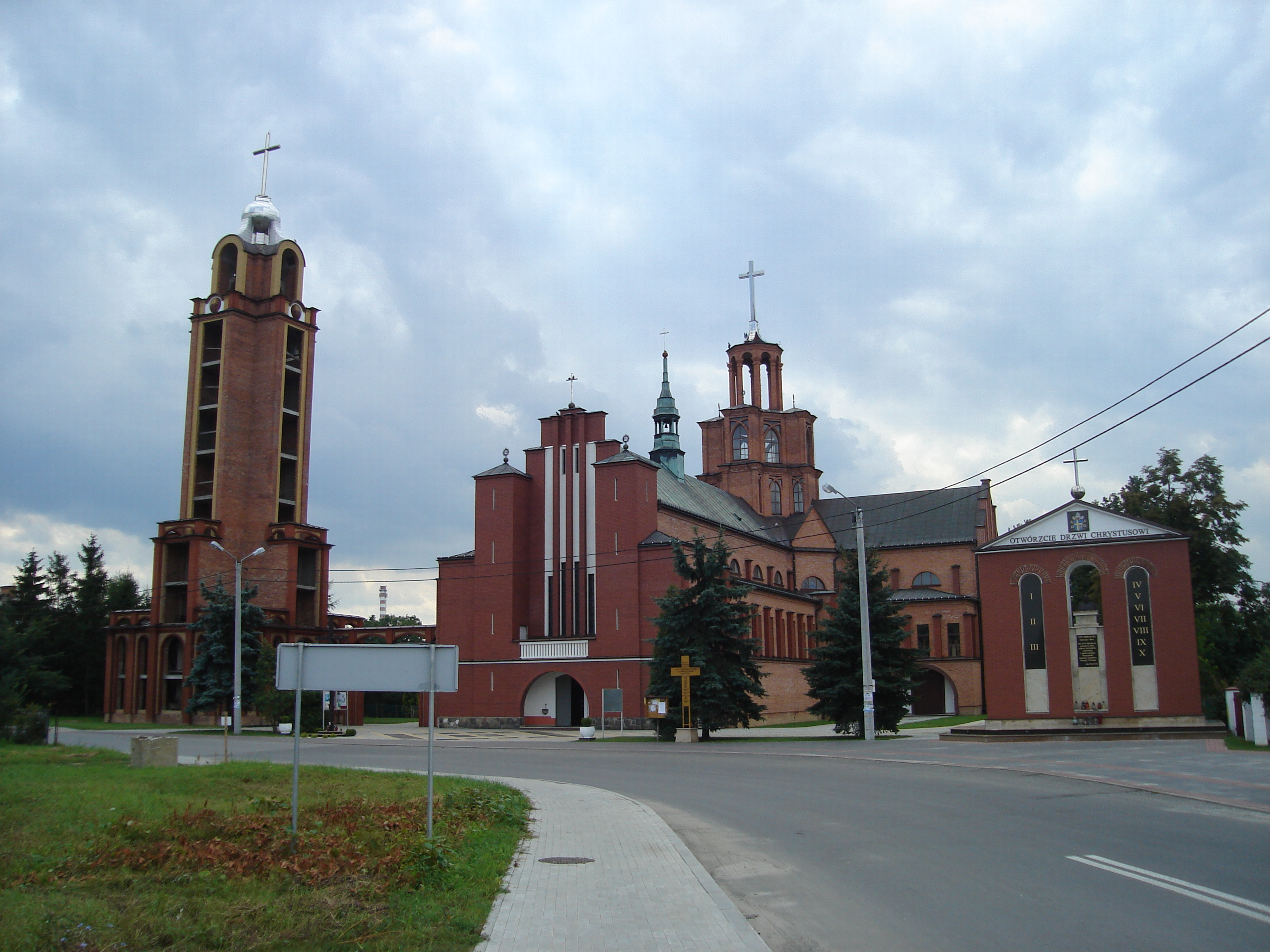
- Church of Saints Francis de Sales and Andrew Bobola

- Location within Poland
- Coordinates: 50°40′N 21°51′E
- Country: Poland
- Voivodeship: Subcarpathian
- County: Tarnobrzeg
- Gmina: Gorzyce
- Elevation: 200 m (660 ft)

Population
  - Total: 7,116
- Time zone: UTC+1 (CET)
  - Summer (DST): UTC+2 (CEST)
- Vehicle registration: RTA
- Website: http://gorzyce.itl.pl

Gorzyce [ɡɔˈʐɨt͡sɛ] is a village in Tarnobrzeg County, Subcarpathian Voivodeship, in south-eastern Poland. It is the seat of the gmina (administrative district) called Gmina Gorzyce.

A river flowing next to the village is called Łęg.

Four Polish citizens were murdered by Nazi Germany in the village during World War II.
