= Gmina Grębów =

Gmina Grębów Grębów Commune
- Gmina
- Flag Coat of arms
- Interactive map of Gmina Grębów
- Coordinates (Grębów): 50°34′N 21°52′E
- Country: Poland
- Voivodeship: Subcarpathian
- County: Tarnobrzeg County
- Seat: Grębów

Area
  - Total: 186.28 km^{2} (71.92 sq mi)

Population (2006)
  - Total: 9,703
  - Density: 52.09/km^{2} (134.9/sq mi)
- Website: http://www.grebow.com.pl/

Gmina Grębów is a rural gmina (administrative district) in Tarnobrzeg County, Subcarpathian Voivodeship, in south-eastern Poland. Its seat is the village of Grębów, which lies approximately 14 kilometres (9 mi) east of Tarnobrzeg and 60 km (37 mi) north of the regional capital Rzeszów.

The gmina covers an area of 186.28 square kilometres (71.9 sq mi), and as of 2006 its total population is 9,703.

== Villages ==
Gmina Grębów contains the villages and settlements of Grądki, Grębów, Jamnica, Kąt, Krawce, Niwa, Nowy Grębów, Palędzie, Piasek, Poręby Furmańskie, Rynek, Sokół, Stale, Szlachecka, Wiry, Wydrza, Zabrnie Górne, Zapolednik and Żupawa.

== Neighbouring gminas ==
Gmina Grębów is bordered by the towns of Stalowa Wola and Tarnobrzeg, and by the gminas of Bojanów, Gorzyce, Nowa Dęba and Zaleszany.
