= MarkiLokuras =

Spanish YouTuber (born 1997)

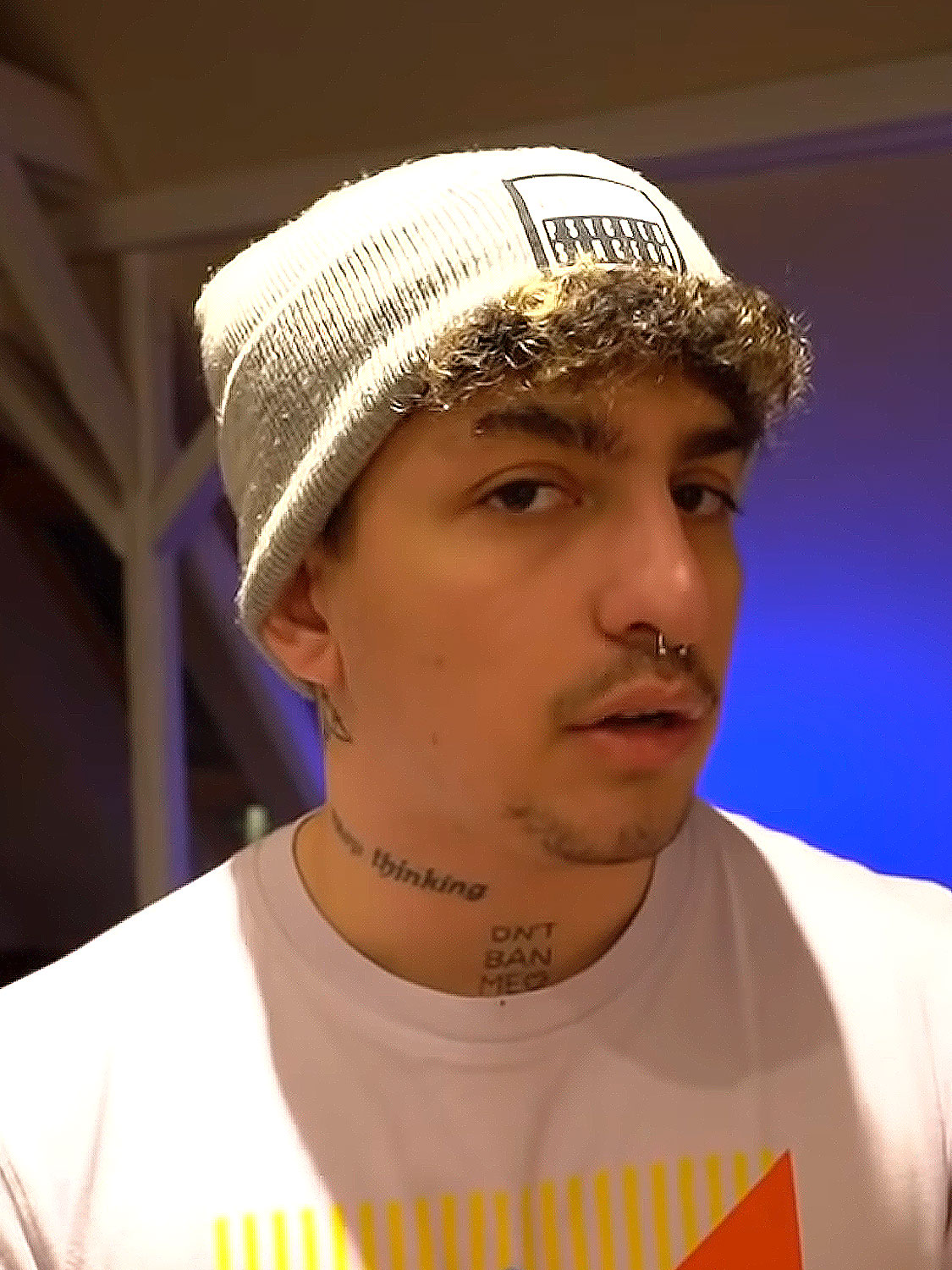

Personal information
- Name: Marcos Barragán Rosado
- Nickname: Marki
- Born: March 22, 1997 (age 29); Talavera la Real, Extremadura, Spain

Career information
- Games: Fortnite
- Playing career: 2017–present

Team history
- 2018–2021: Team Heretics

Twitch information
- Channel: MarkiLokurasY
- Years active: 2017–present
- Genre: Gaming
- Followers: 1.6 million

YouTube information
- Channel: MarkiLokuras
- Years active: 2013–present
- Subscribers: 1.03 million
- Views: 134 million
- Last updated: 4 September 2024

Marcos Barragán Rosado (born March 22, 1997), better known online as MarkiLokuras, is a Spanish YouTuber and content creator. He is known for playing Fortnite and other games with more than 1.6 million followers he is the 50th most followed Spanish Speaking streamer on Twitch.

== Early life ==
Marcos was born on March 22, 1997, in Talavera la Real (Badajoz, Spain). On October 6, 2013, he created his YouTube channel, and in 2017 he started livestreaming on Twitch. In April 2018 he joined the e-sports team Team Heretics and in the early 2020's he moved to his gaming house in Madrid, however after a few months after he moved to the club's mansion which is also located in Madrid. He left the club in February 2021 when he moved to Frankfurt, Germany to compete at the highest level in Fortnite. In February 26, 2023 he joined the e-sports team ZETA and in early March moved to his gaming house.

== Professional career ==
MarkiLokuras has competed professionally in Fortnite and in Apex Legends. His competitive stage is marked by his link to the Spanish team Heretics from April 2018 to February 2021. He currently competes in Fortnite as part of team ZETA.

=== Fortnite ===
His biggest competitive achievement is second place in the Fortnite Fall Skirmish Series - Clubs Standings for which he earned a $10,000 prize, although his largest prize was $20,000.00 for fifth place in Fortnite Fall Skirmish Series - Week 4 EU. Despite his high level, he failed to qualify for the 2019 Fortnite World Cup. On the other hand, he did manage to qualify to the 2019 ESL Katowice Royale tournament in Katowice, Poland along with Ryux, his teammate at the time. But due to several bugs in the game he didn't manage to get into prizes. H has also performed well in other tournaments including the Fortnite Winter Royale and the Fortnite Pro AM charity event involving Streamers and Celebrities.

== Social media career ==
Marki started his social media career by uploading videos and making Minecraft livestreams. When Fortnite came out he changed his content and it is thanks to this game that he has achieved the numbers he has now. He is principally known for doing live streams on Twitch and uploading videos to YouTube, as on both platforms he has more than 1 million followers. But he also creates content on other social networks such as Instagram, Twitter and TikTok.

== Tournament results ==
Notable tournament placements
Date	Game	Location	Event	Placement	Winnings (US$)
2019-04-13	Apex Legends	Berlin, Germany	TwitchCon Europe Showdown 2019 - Qualifier 1	15th	$925
2019-02-19	Apex Legends	Online	Twitch Rivals: ALC Europe 2	5th	$7,500
2018-12-01	Fortnite	Online	porn (EU)	21st	$1,500
2018-10-28	Fortnite	Online	Fortnite Fall Skirmish Series - Clubs Standings	2nd	$10,000
2018-10-28	Fortnite	San José, United States	Fortnite Fall Skirmish Series - Week 6 - Stream-Vitational @TwitchCon	32nd	$13,750
2018-10-12	Fortnite	Online	Fortnite Fall Skirmish Series - Week 4 EU	5th	$20,000
2018-08-25	Fortnite	Online	Twitch Rivals x Fortnite Summer Skirmish Series - Week 7 EU (Day 2)	18th	$925
2018-08-18	Fortnite	Online	Twitch Rivals x Fortnite Summer Skirmish Series - Week 6 EU (Day 2)	11th	$4,175

== Controversies ==
It has been at the center of controversy several times. The first was over an argument with his mother during a Twitch live stream in which Marki to de-stress hit a punching bag with a baseball bat while his mother was still in the room. This clip went around the world and starred news in all the Spanish media. Such was the virality of this clip that it even appeared in a Netflix documentary called Not a Game. Marcos has explained on several occasions that this clip was taken out of context as he has a great relationship with his mother. The second one was due to a ban from the Twitch platform for insulting that lasted several months. Like the previous one, he also starred in several news in the press.

On 24 January 2023 he was expelled from Minecraft Extremo for graves insultis to JCorko, other player.

== Filmography ==
Year	Title	Role	Ref.
2019	La historia de MarkiLokuras - Team Heretics	Main	
