= Marki, Voronezh Oblast =

Marki Марки
- Selo
- Location within Voronezh Oblast Location within Russia
- Coordinates: 50°46′N 39°40′E
- Country: Russia
- Region: Voronezh Oblast
- District: Kamensky District
- Time zone: UTC+3:00

Marki (Russian: Марки) is a rural locality (a selo) and the administrative center of Markovskoye Rural Settlement, Kamensky District, Voronezh Oblast, Russia. The population was 1,002 as of 2010. There are 7 streets.

== Geography ==
Marki is located 24 km northeast of Kamenka (the district's administrative centre) by road. Kozki is the nearest rural locality.
