= Headspace gas chromatography =

Chromatography process

Headspace gas chromatography uses headspace gas—from the top or "head" of a sealed container containing a liquid or solid brought to equilibrium—injected directly onto a gas chromatographic column for separation and analysis. In this process, only the most volatile (most readily existing as a vapor) substances make it to the column. The technique is commonly applied to the analysis of polymers, food and beverages, blood alcohol levels, environmental variables, cosmetics, and pharmaceutical ingredients.

== Volatiles ==
Materials that exist primarily in the gas phase at STP (i.e., "evaporates more than 95% by weight within six months under ambient evaporation testing conditions") are referred to as "volatile." Many natural and man-made (anthropogenic) materials are stable in two states at STP, earning them the title "semivolatile."

== Food ==
Because odors strongly influence the quality and desirability of foods, headspace analysis is widely applied to both unprocessed and processed (i.e., cooked) foods. For example, the volatile components of roasted coffee beans and coffee itself have been analyzed in this way. Some odorants in coffees are aldehydes (isovaleraldehyde, isobutyraldehyde, and 2-methylbutanal and the thiol methanethiol. The aldehydes occur at the level of 200-1000 micrograms/L. Headspace gas chromatography has been applied to durian, which is infamous for its odor. The fruit emits the following organosulfur compounds: diethyltrisulfide, diethyldisulfide, dithiolane, dimethyl sulfide, and 3-methylthiazolidine.

== Insect pheromones ==
Insect pheromones have been identified using headspace analysis using the technique of electroattennography. In this approach, an insects antenna serve as the detector for the gas chromatography.

== Environmental samples ==
A naturally occurring volatile that is sometimes found in aqueous solution is methane; water itself is semivolatile. Man-made or anthropogenic chemicals also occur in these classes. Examples of volatile anthropogenic chemicals include the refrigerants chlorofluorocarbons (CFCs) and hydrofluorocarbons (HFCs). Semivolatile anthropogenics can exist as mixtures, such as petroleum distillates or as pure chemicals like trichloroethylene (TCE).

Headspace gas chromatography offers a method for determining if there is natural biodegradation processes occurring in contaminated aquifers. For example, fuel hydrocarbons will break down into methane. Chlorinated solvents such as trichloroethylene, break down into ethene and chloride. Detecting these compounds can determine if biodegradation processes are occurring and possibly at what rate. Natural gas extracted from the earth also contains many low molecular weight hydrocarbon compounds such as methane, ethane, propane, and butane. For example, methane has been found in many water wells in West Virginia.

== RSKSOP-175 analysis of petroleum gases ==
A widely used methods for headspace analysis is described by the United States Environmental Protection Agency (USEPA) was developed as a "high quality, defendable, and documented way to measure" methane, ethane, and ethene, RSKSOP-175 is a standard operating procedure (SOP) and an unofficial method employed by the USEPA to detect and quantify dissolved gases in water. This method has been used to quantify dissolved hydrogen, methane, ethylene, ethane, propane, butane, acetylene, nitrogen, nitrous oxide, and oxygen. The method uses headspace gas injected into a gas chromatographic column (GC) to determine the original concentration in a water sample.

=== Methodology ===
A sample of water is collected in the field in a vial without headspace and capped with a Teflon septum or crimp top to minimize the escape of volatile gases. It is beneficial to store the bottles upside down to further minimize loss of analytes. Before analysis begins, the sample is brought to room temperature and temperature is recorded. In the laboratory, a headspace is created by displacing water with high purity helium. The bottle is then shaken upside down for a minimum of five minutes in order to equilibrate the dissolved gases into the headspace. It's important to note that the bottle must be kept upside down for the remainder of analysis if manually injected. A known volume of headspace gas is then injected onto a gas chromatographic column. An automated process can also be utilized. Individual components (gases) are separated and detected by either a thermal conductivity detector (TCD), a flame ionization detector (FID), or an electron capture detector (ECD). Using the known temperature of the sample, the bottle volume, the concentrations of gas in the headspace (as determined by GC), and Henry's law constant, the concentration of the original water sample is calculated.

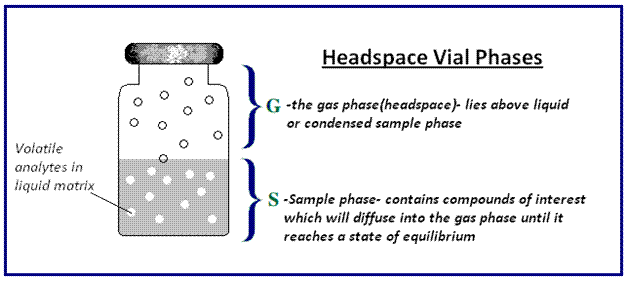
Phases of a headspace vial used in gas chromatography

=== Calculations ===
Using the known temperature of the sample, the bottle volume, the concentrations of gas in the headspace (as determined by GC), and Henry's law constant, the concentration of the original water sample is calculated. Total gas concentration (TC) in the original water sample is calculated by determining the concentration of headspace and converting this to the partial pressure and then solving for the aqueous concentration which partitioned in the gas phase (C_{AH}) and the concentration remaining in the aqueous phase (C_{A}). The total concentration of gas in original sample (TC) is the sum of the concentration partitioned in the gas phase (C_{AH}) and the concentration remaining in the aqueous phase (C_{A}):

$$TC = C_{AH} + C_{A}$$

Henry's law states that the mole fraction of a dissolved gas (x_{g}) is equal to the partial pressure of the gas (p_{g}) at equilibrium divided by Henry's law constant (H). Gas solubility coefficients are used to calculate Henry's law constant:

$$x_{g} = p_{g} / H$$

After manipulating equations and substituting volumes of each phase, the molar concentration of water (55.5 mol/L) and the molecular weight of the gas analyte (MW), a final equation is solved:

$$TC = (55.5mol/L)*p_{g}/H*MW(g/mol)*10^{3}mg/g + \lbrack(V_{h}/(V_{b} - V_{h})\rbrack*C_{g}*(MW(g/mol)/(22.4L/mol))*\lbrack 273K/(T + 273K)\rbrack*10^{3}mg/g$$

Where V_{b} is the bottle volume and V_{h} is the volume of headspace. C_{g} is the volumetric concentration of gas. For full calculation examples, reference RSK-175SOP.

=== Other methods and techniques ===
Prior to RSKSOP-175, the EPA used Method 3810 (1986), which before that was Method 5020. However, Method 3810 is still used by some laboratories.

Other headspace GC methods include:

- ASTM D4526-12 and ASTM D8028-17
- EPA 5021A
- Pennsylvania Department of Environmental Protection (PA-DEP) 3686 (#BOL 6019)
