= Gmina Gorzyce, Podkarpackie Voivodeship =

Gmina Gorzyce Gorzyce Commune
- Gmina
- Flag Coat of arms
- Interactive map of Gmina Gorzyce
- Coordinates (Gorzyce): 50°40′N 21°51′E
- Country: Poland
- Voivodeship: Subcarpathian
- County: Tarnobrzeg County
- Seat: Gorzyce

Area
  - Total: 69.36 km^{2} (26.78 sq mi)

Population (2006)
  - Total: 13,628
  - Density: 196.5/km^{2} (508.9/sq mi)
- Website: http://www.gorzyce.itl.pl/

Gmina Gorzyce is a rural gmina (administrative district) in Tarnobrzeg County, Subcarpathian Voivodeship, in south-eastern Poland. Its seat is the village of Gorzyce, which lies approximately 15 kilometres (9 mi) north-east of Tarnobrzeg and 72 km (45 mi) north of the regional capital Rzeszów.

The gmina covers an area of 69.36 square kilometres (26.8 sq mi), and as of 2006 its total population is 13,628.

== Villages ==
Gmina Gorzyce contains the villages and settlements of Furmany, Gorzyce, Motycze Poduchowne, Orliska, Sokolniki, Trześń, Wrzawy and Zalesie Gorzyckie.

== Neighbouring gminas ==
Gmina Gorzyce is bordered by the towns of Sandomierz and Tarnobrzeg, and by the gminas of Dwikozy, Grębów, Radomyśl nad Sanem and Zaleszany.
