= Tarnobrzeg County =

Tarnobrzeg County Powiat tarnobrzeski
- County
- Flag Coat of arms

- Location within the voivodeship
- Coordinates (Tarnobrzeg): 50°35′N 21°41′E
- Country: Poland
- Voivodeship: Subcarpathian
- Seat: Tarnobrzeg
- Gminas: Total 4: Gmina Baranów Sandomierski; Gmina Gorzyce; Gmina Grębów; Gmina Nowa Dęba

Area
  - Total: 520.02 km^{2} (200.78 sq mi)

Population (2019)
  - Total: 53,115
  - Density: 102.14/km^{2} (264.54/sq mi)
  - Urban: 12,608
  - Rural: 40,507
- Car plates: RTA
- Website: www.powiat-tarnobrzeski.qs.pl

Tarnobrzeg County (Polish: powiat tarnobrzeski) is a unit of territorial administration and local government (powiat) in Subcarpathian Voivodeship, south-eastern Poland. It came into being on January 1, 1999, as a result of the Polish local government reforms passed in 1998. Its administrative seat is the city of Tarnobrzeg, although the city is not part of the county (it constitutes a separate city county). The only towns in Tarnobrzeg County are Nowa Dęba, which lies 18 km (11 mi) south of Tarnobrzeg, and Baranów Sandomierski, 15 km (9 mi) south-west of Tarnobrzeg.

The county covers an area of 520.02 square kilometres (200.8 sq mi). As of 2019 its total population is 53,115, of which the population of Nowa Dęba is 11,152, that of Baranów Sandomierski is 1,456, and the rural population is 40,507.

== Neighbouring counties ==
Apart from the city of Tarnobrzeg, Tarnobrzeg County is also bordered by Sandomierz County to the north, Stalowa Wola County to the east, Kolbuszowa County and Mielec County to the south, and Staszów County to the west.

== Administrative divisions ==
The county is subdivided into four gminas (two urban-rural and two rural). These are listed in the following table, in descending order of population.

Gmina	Type	Area (km^{2})	Population (2019)	Seat
Gmina Nowa Dęba	urban-rural	142.5	18,103	Nowa Dęba
Gmina Gorzyce	rural	69.4	13,186	Gorzyce
Gmina Baranów Sandomierski	urban-rural	121.9	11,879	Baranów Sandomierski
Gmina Grębów	rural	186.3	9,947	Grębów
