= Stany, Podkarpackie Voivodeship =

Stany
- Village
- Location within Poland
- Coordinates: 50°26′22″N 21°58′45″E
- Country: Poland
- Voivodeship: Subcarpathian
- County: Stalowa Wola
- Gmina: Bojanów

Stany [ˈstanɨ] is a village in the administrative district of Gmina Bojanów, within Stalowa Wola County, Subcarpathian Voivodeship, in south-eastern Poland. It lies approximately 5 kilometres (3 mi) north-east of Bojanów, 17 km (11 mi) south of Stalowa Wola, and 46 km (29 mi) north of the regional capital Rzeszów.

== Notable people ==
- Stanisław Mielech, a Polish footballer, originator of the name of the Legia Warsaw club

== Sports ==
=== Łęg Stany ===
Łęg Stany is a Polish football club based. They currently compete in the B-class, the eight-tier of Poland professional football, having suffered relegation from the A-class in 2020–21. The club's name comes from the Łęg river, that flows through the village. The former football player of the club is Tomasz Karasiński, the III liga top-scorer with Tłoki Gorzyce.
