= Tomasz Karasiński =

Polish footballer

Personal information
- Date of birth: 25 November 1973 (age 52)
- Place of birth: Poland
- Position: Midfielder

Senior career*
Years	Team	Apps	(Gls)
1992–1993	Stal Stalowa Wola	0	(0)
1994–2000	Tłoki Gorzyce		
2001	Łada Biłgoraj		
2002	Pogoń Leżajsk		
2002	Pogoń Staszów		
2003	Termopol Żabno		
2003–2004	Płomień Trześń		
2004–2005	Unia Skowierzyn		
2006–2007	Strażak Przyszów		
2008–2009	Sparta Jeżowe		
2010	Łęg Stany		
- * Club domestic league appearances and goals

Tomasz Karasiński (born 25 November 1973) is a Polish former footballer who played as a midfielder. He was in the broad squad of Stal Stalowa Wola when they played in the Ekstraklasa, without making a debut. On 13 October 1999, he made his Polish Cup debut, as he played the entire game for Tłoki Gorzyce against KS Myszków.

In the past, he was the top scorer of the III liga (then the third tier), as a footballer in Tłoki Gorzyce.
