= Zaklików =

- Town
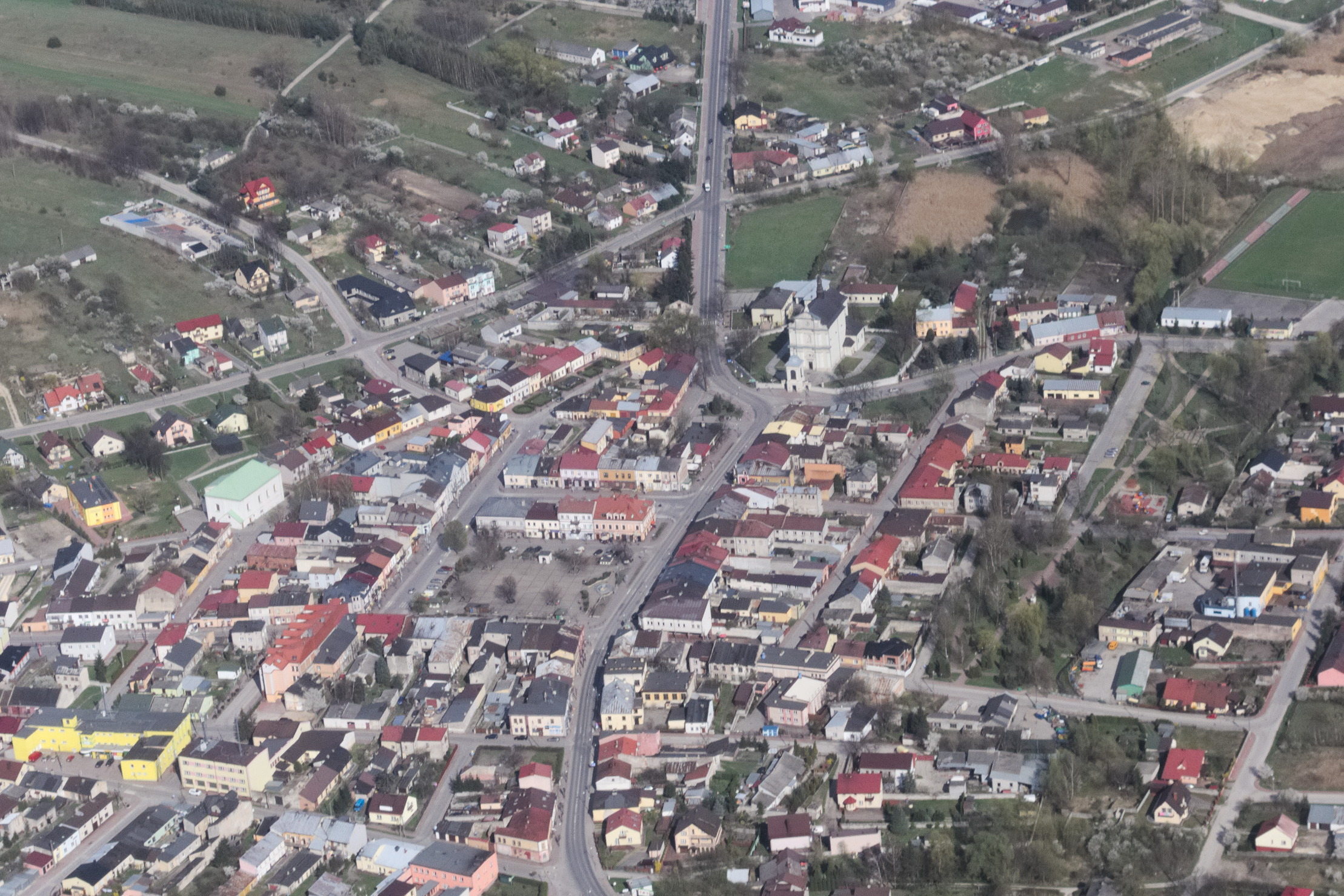
- Aerial view of Zaklików

- Coat of arms

- Location within Poland
- Coordinates: 50°45′24″N 22°6′6″E
- Country: Poland
- Voivodeship: Subcarpathian
- County: Stalowa Wola
- Gmina: Zaklików
- Founded: 1565
- Town rights: 1565
- Founder: Stanisław Zaklika Czyżowski
- Named for: Stanisław Zaklika Czyżowski

Population (2009)
  - Total: 3,010
- Time zone: UTC+1 (CET)
  - Summer (DST): UTC+2 (CEST)
- Postal code: 37-470
- Vehicle registration: RST

Zaklików (pronounced [zaˈklikuf]) is a town in Poland, located in the Subcarpathian Voivodeship, in Stalowa Wola County.

It is located at an altitude of 593 feet (180 m). On the southside of Zaklików in the Subcarpathian Voivodeship the Pysznica Gmina is located. To the southwest is the town of Radomyśl nad Sanem. The town is known for the production of sulfur; it also manufactures furniture and nuts & bolts.

== History ==
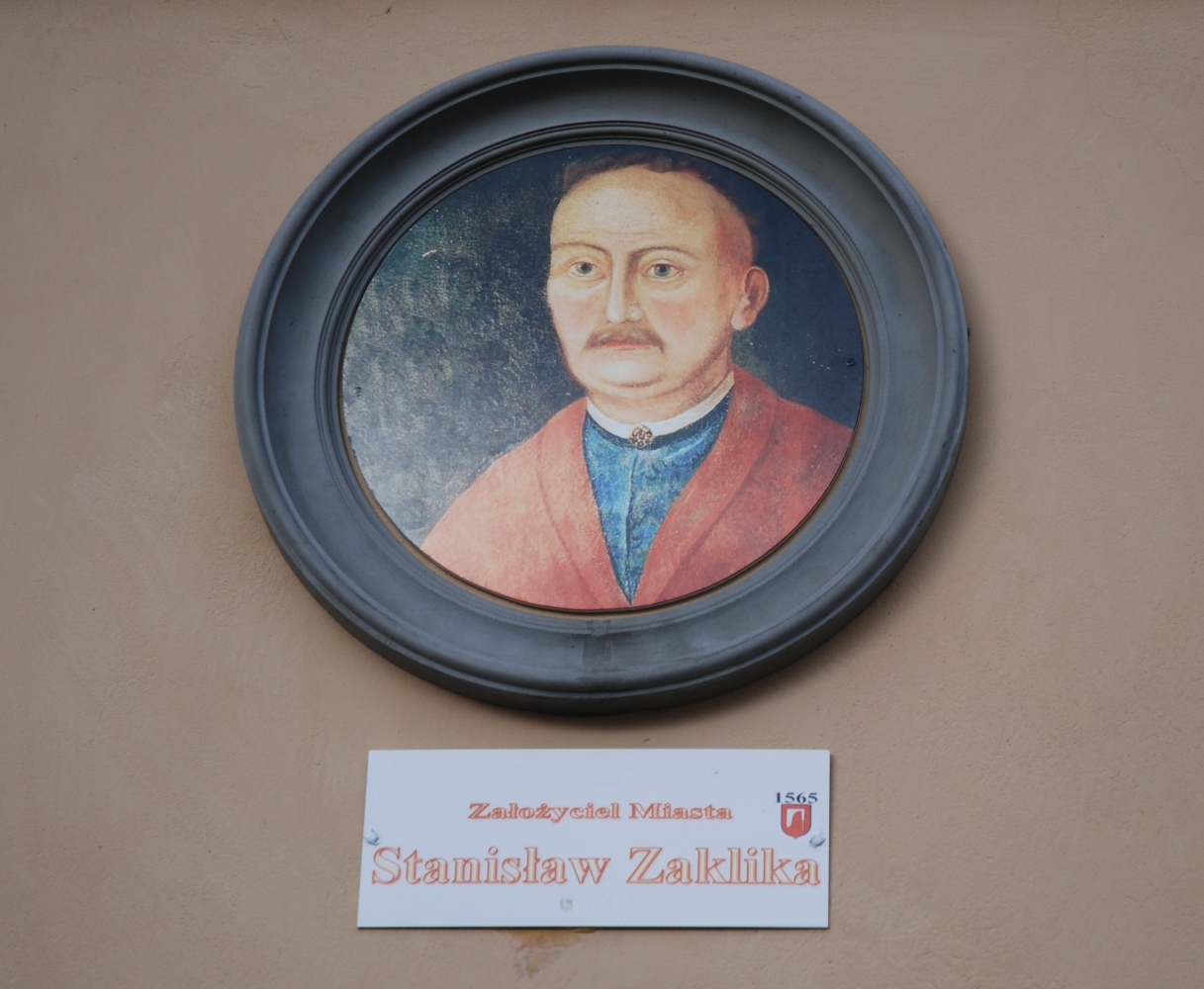
Portrait of Stanisław Zaklika Czyżowski, the town's founder on one of the buildings

Before the town existed, a Catholic parish was first established in Zdziechowice, a village 2 kilometres (1.2 mi) distance on September 22, 1409. The town of Zaklików was founded on April 9, 1565, by the royal assent obtained by the Castellan Stanisław Zaklika Czyżowski from the King Sigismund II Augustus, on the lands previously belonging to the village of Zdziechowice. The founding charter was based on the Magdeburg Law. The city took its name along with the coat of arms from its founder. In 1787 Zaklików had 130 houses and 800 inhabitants. After the Third Partition of Poland in 1795 the townn became part of the Austrian Partition of Poland. After the Polish victory in the Austro-Polish War of 1809, it became part of the short-lived Duchy of Warsaw, and after the duchy's dissolution in 1815, it became part of the Russian Empire (Congress Poland) in 1815 after the shifting of borders at the Congress of Vienna.

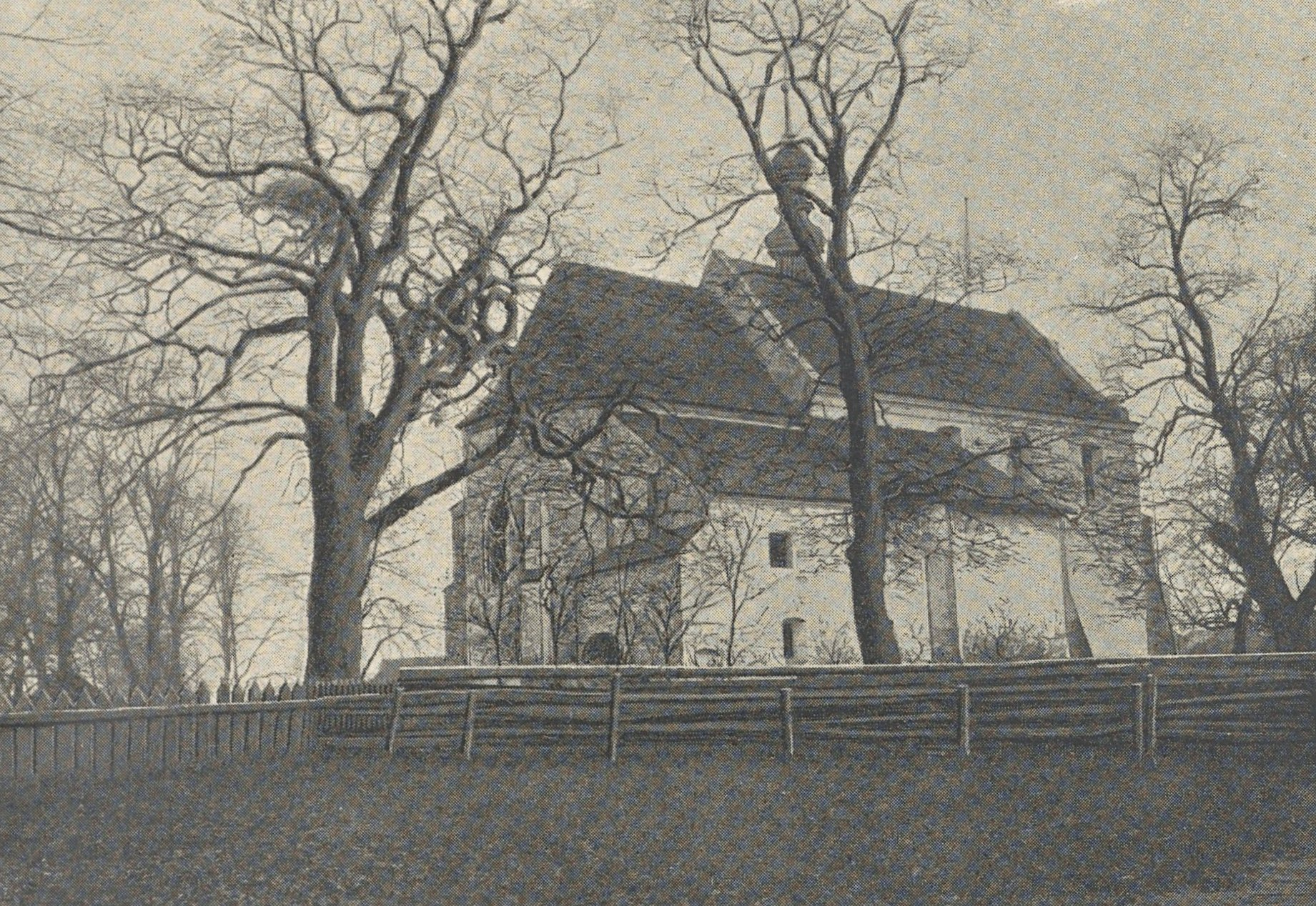
Holy Trinity church ca 1908

Zaklików was controlled by the Lublin namestniks under the Russian Partition. The Jewish community was small. The Qahal had 192 members in 1790 at the time of the dismemberment of Poland. However, the Tsarist anti-Polish policies resulted in the rapid influx of refugees. By 1869 the number of inhabitants reached 2,080. In 1868 Joseph Lewinstein became the Rabbi of Zaklików, but he moved in 1875 to become rabbi of Serotzk in the Łomża Governorate. Zaklików lost its town charter in punishment for the unsuccessful Polish January Uprising against Russian rule. Zaklików remained in Russian hands until World War I. In 1914–15 the front passed through Zaklików three times. In the summer of 1915 the Russians were pushed out from Zaklików by the advance of the German and Austro-Hungarian armies. In November 1918, at the conclusion of war, Zaklików again became part of sovereign Poland.

=== World War II ===
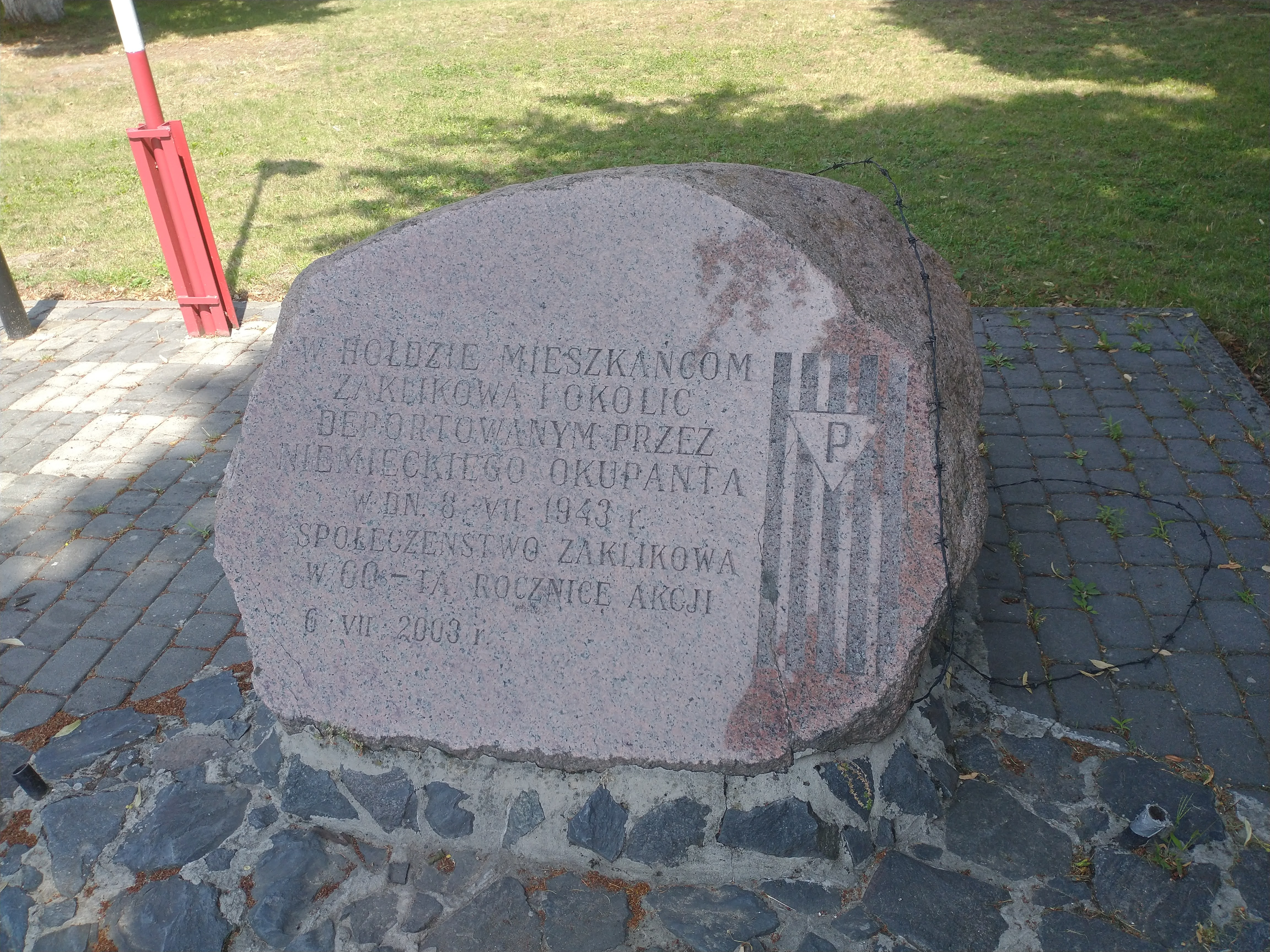
Memorial to local victims of German deportation in World War II

On September 13, 1939, the 14th army of the German Heeresgruppe Süd was advancing east and northwest in the course of Nazi-Soviet invasion of Poland. Enemy forces in front of the Korps divided into two parts: Northern & Southern. The northern part was withdrawing across the San River into the woods around Zaklików and Biłgoraj, last time spotted on the Janów – Frampol road. On September 14, 1939, the Polish Armoured Train Nr. 51 ("Marszałek I"), while covering the retreat of Polish forces near the village of Zaklików, the train managed to delay the advance of the German 4th Infantry Division units until the next day and prevented the Polish 94th Inf. Rgt. from being cut off from the Polish main forces.

Several Poles, who were either born or lived and worked in Zaklików, were murdered by the Russians in the Katyn massacre in 1940.

Sometime in 1942, 20 partisans led by Gregori Korchinski, most of them Jews fighting against the Nazis in occupied Poland, moved to the Zaklików area and set up a partisan base in the village of Ludmilovka. They recruited additional 15 local men. Among the Jews, there were unified groups commanded by Yaacov Freitag and Reuven Pintel.

==== The Holocaust ====
Germans occupied Zaklików in mid September 1939 and immediately burned down the Jewish residential area and forced the Jewish population to assemble, killing several at random. Afterwards, they robbed and plundered the Jewish community and conscripted many for forced labor.

In 1941, Zaklików became a destination for Jews in surrounding areas who had been forced to leave their own towns by the Nazi SS and Police Chief of Lublin in cooperation with the "Sub-Department of Population and Welfare" of the Governor of the district of Lublin, on the proposal of the local authorities. Officer Lenk, a subordinate of the District Chief of Janów-Lubelski, wrote to the SS-and-Police-Chief of Lublin asking for deportation of local Jews to a different locations in Poland. Zaklików was mentioned with 1,500 Jews to be "evacuated".

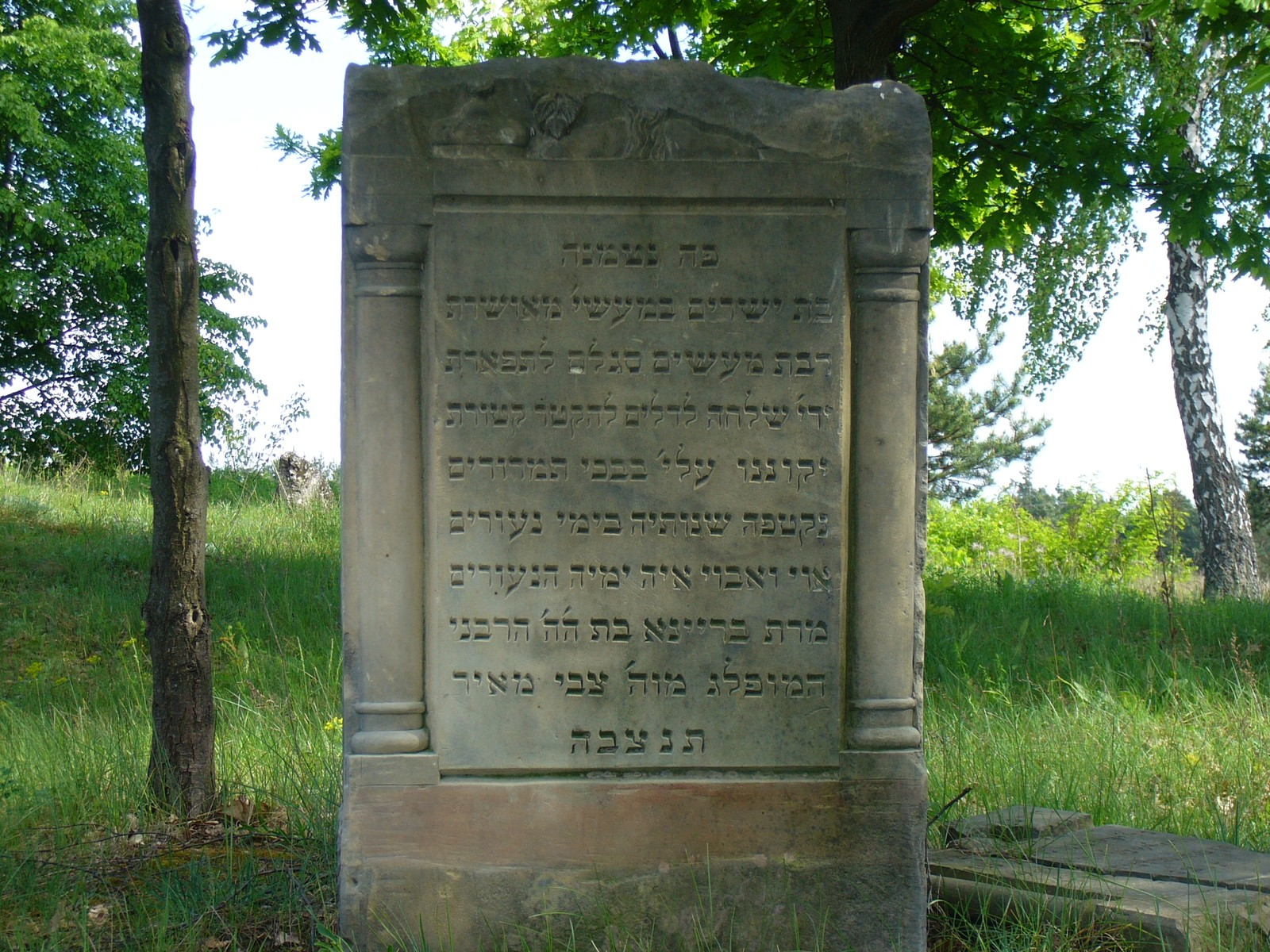
Historic tombstone at the Jewish cemetery

Around October 15, 1942, the SS, the Ukrainian auxiliaries and the German gendarmerie gathered all Jews in the marketplace. Hundreds, mostly children and the aged and ill, were murdered on the spot, and the rest were taken to the Belzec extermination camp where they were immediately murdered. Some 200 had hidden from the roundup. After this, those who hid reemerged and Jews from other towns were forcibly brought to the ghetto including the entire Jewish population of the nearby town of Janów Lubelski, which included a few hundred Jews who had been deported there from Vienna in 1941. Jews of Kraśnik were also brought to Zaklików. According to testimony of Nuchim Rozenel, from the Jewish Historical Institute in Warsaw, on this month, the Hassidic rabbi of Turobin was in the Kraśnik Ghetto together with his son and the son's family, and they were all deported to Zaklików. On November 2 and 3, the 2,000 Jews living in Zaklików, including the rabbi and his family, were also sent to Belzec to be murdered.

From the archives of the reports of the Argentinian diplomatic missions about the racist policies of Germany and the occupied European countries (1933–1945), on June 25, 1943, Luis Luti, the Commercial Attaché of Argentina in Germany sent a letter to Argentina's Minister of Foreign Relations and Culture, Segundo R. Storni, in which he points out that "the road in which the deported Jews and the Jewish inhabitants of Poland were pushed to their ruin and destruction by the Nazis". In this report, he mentions the Warsaw Ghetto Uprising and refers to the Treblinka concentration camp. The letter, numbered as "Note #275", and written in Berlin, states that after the violent dissolution of the Warsaw ghetto, in which the SS troops also suffered losses, according to the "Pat" agency, the Germans put great effort into "liquidating" the ghettos of the small cities in the provinces from which the Jews were deported. In this publication, the following cities are mentioned: Kraśnik, Zaklików, Lublin, Zawichost, Biała Podlaska, Jedresejow, Łuków, Sokołów, and Rawa Ruska.

There were about 200 survivors among Zaklików's prewar population of 1,400. Most of the survivors had fled to the Soviet occupied territory at the beginning of the war or had escaped to the forest and fought as partisans.

=== Post-war ===
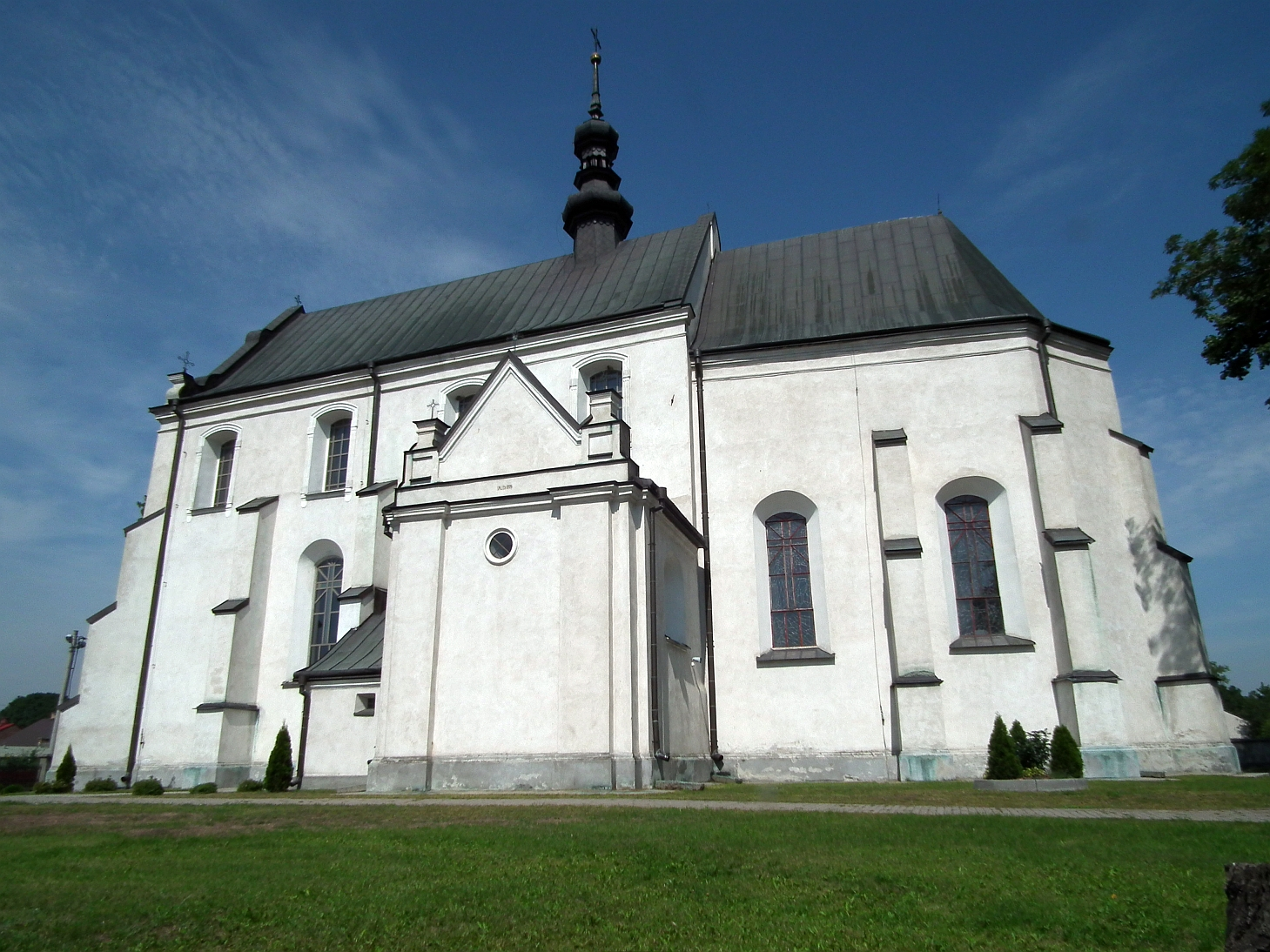
Baroque Holy Trinity church

Based on the 1989 population survey about the social stratification in Eastern Europe, Zaklików had a population of 8,877. According to the coding of geographical units based on the Wykaz symboli terytorialnych wojewodztw, gmin i miast (Register of Territorial Codes for Voivodeships, Counties and Cities) of the Warsaw Glowny Urzad Statystyczny (Central Statistical Office) of 1992, the code for Zaklikow is 83721 and it is considered a rural county. Abbreviations for GPS are: ZKL, ZKLKW, ZAKLKW. In 2000, The Levi-Strauss Foundation donated US$2,400 to the Dom Pomocy Spolecznej in Zaklików, to renovate a 24-hour care center for mentally disabled women.

On 1 January 2014 town rights were restored.

== Notable people ==
- Samuel Klein (1923–2014), business magnate. Born in Zaklikow, after World War II he moved to São Paulo, Brazil, and founded the Casas Bahia chain of department stores in Brazil, building them into the top retailer in the country.

== Historical figures ==
- Zaklika of Miedzygorze, Chancellor of Poland some time in the 14th century.
- Zaklika, who built hospitals in Queen Jadwiga's time.
