= August 2008 European tornado outbreak =

Weather event in Europe

Meteorological history
- Date: 3–4, August 2008

Tornado outbreak
- Tornadoes: 13 confirmed
- Max. rating: F4 tornado
- Duration: ~28 1/2 hours

Overall effects
- Casualties: 3 fatalities (+1 non-tornadic), ≥50 injuries
- Damage: Several million Euros
- Areas affected: France, Germany, Netherlands, Poland

The August 2008 European tornado outbreak was a widespread severe weather event which spawned thirteen tornadoes in four countries, one of which killed three people in France. This particular tornado reached F4 intensity.

Tornadoes are amongst the most costly natural hazards in Poland. On 15 August 2008, a tornado resulted in damage to 1624 buildings in the provinces of Opole, Katowice and Łódź. In the aftermath of this disaster, a damage survey was performed which is presented in this paper. While the tornado was passing, the peak gust wind velocities were estimated to be from 52 m/s (187 km/h) to 72 m/s (259 km/h) in the studied area. For low-rise brick buildings, which are common in Poland, some design details for the current building standards are suggested. They can lead to the improvement of building technology used in this type of buildings in order to mitigate the effects of extreme winds, which occur in tornadoes.

== Meteorological synopsis ==
On 3 August, several areas of low pressure developed. Frontal systems extended from one of the lows, stretching from the Azores to the Germany coastline.

== Confirmed tornadoes ==
Confirmed tornadoes by Fujita rating
FU	F0	F1	F2	F3	F4	F5	Total
0	5	4	3	0	1	0	13

=== 3 August event ===
List of reported tornadoes - Sunday, 3 August 2008
F#	Location	State	Coord.	Time (UTC)	Path length	Damage
Germany
F0	N of Langeneß (1st tornado)	Schleswig-Holstein	54.66°N 8.60°E	1150	unknown	A brief waterspout developed near the coast of northern Germany. The waterspout dissipated before reaching shore.
F1	N of Langeneß (2nd tornado)	Schleswig-Holstein	54.66°N 8.60°E	1150	unknown	The second of two waterspouts near Langeneß developed in the same location as the first but briefly tracked onshore, tossing beach chairs before dissipating.
F0	N of Büsum	Schleswig-Holstein		1300	unknown	A brief waterspout developed near Büsum.
F0	N of Norderney	Lower Saxony		1453	unknown	A brief waterspout developed near Norderney.
F2	Goldenstedt area	Lower Saxony	52.78°N 8.43°E	2115	4 km (2.5 mi)	The strongest tornado to touch down in Germany during the outbreak struck Goldenstedt. Numerous homes were damaged by the tornado and several trees were uprooted.
Netherlands
F1	Oostermeer area	Friesland	53.17°N 6.05°E	1745	unknown	A tornado tracked for 25 minutes in Friesland and damaged large areas of trees and tore roofs off several homes.
F2	Groningen area	Groningen	53.20°N 6.25°E	1845	unknown	A strong F2 tornado damaged or destroyed several homes and barns and uprooted numerous trees. The maximum width of the tornado was estimated at 200 metres. Dozens of people were reportedly injured by the tornado and damages exceeded €100,000.
France
F4	Hautmont area	Nord	50.25°N 3.93°E	2200	18.7 km (11.6 mi)	3 deaths – See section on this tornado

=== 4 August event ===
List of reported tornadoes - Monday, 4 August 2008
F#	Location	State	Coord.	Time (UTC)	Path length	Damage
Germany
F1	Deckbergen area	Lower Saxony		0258	2.5 km (1.6 mi)	A 200 to 300 metre wide tornado damaged several residences.
F1	Birkenau area	Hesse	49.56°N 8.71°E	0650	330 m (360 yd)	A brief and narrow tornado damaged several homes and tore bricks off the local firehouse.
Poland
F0	Augustów area	Podlaskie Voivodeship	53.85°N 23.00°E	1400	200 m (220 yd)	A brief rope tornado touched down in Augustów
F0	Świdnik area	Lublin Voivodeship	51.25°N 22.86°E	1510	200 m (220 yd)	A brief rope tornado touched down in Świdnik
F2	Jastkowice area	Subcarpathian Voivodeship	50.62°N 22.10°E	1615	unknown	

=== Hautmont, France ===
Hautmont, France
- Photo of the tornado

Meteorological history
- Date: August 3, 2008

F4 tornado
- on the Fujita scale
- Highest winds: 207–260 mph (333–418 km/h)

Overall effects
- Casualties: 3 fatalities, 18 injuries

This rare and violent tornado initially touched down outside the city of Pont-sur-Sambre, initially causing damage ranging from F0 to F1 in intensity. The tornado then moved through a corn field at 20:28 UTC before causing damage to power lines and roofs of buildings in the northern part of town. The storm rapidly strengthened immediately after hitting Pont-sur-Sambre, reaching F2-F3 strength just about 2 km from the point of touchdown, and a few homes and structures sustained significant damage in this area. At the 20:31 UTC the tornado intensified further and caused major damage to some rural brick homes, one of which was completely leveled to the ground at F4 (T8) strength, and the other sustaining F2 (T4-T5) damage. With winds in excess of 300 km / h (F4), the tornado reached a forested area, debarking or uprooting all the trees within a radius of 150 m. Maintaining its strength, the violent tornado struck Hautmont, flattening multiple brick homes and structures, killing 3 people, and injuring 18 others. Numerous other homes and some apartment buildings had major structural damage, and a sports complex was also severely damaged. Multiple cars were picked up and thrown hundreds of meters, some of which were hurled into buildings, and large trees were denuded and debarked. Small objects from town were also found tens of kilometers away. At 20:35 the weakening but still strong tornado arrived in Maubeuge, causing damage of F2 (T4/5) and F1 (T2/T3) strength, destroying a church tower and damaging many other buildings. At 20:40 the tornado began to shrink in size and strength, causing F0 damage to some trees and structures before finally dissipating at 20:42 not far from the border of Belgium.

The tornado remained on the ground for about 14 minutes with a displacement speed of about 40–50 km/h and winds that have exceeded 300 km / h along a total path of 18.7 km, killing 3 people and damaging or destroying about 1000 buildings with a width of 150m-200m.

== See also ==
- Tornadoes of 2008
