= Czekaj Pniowski =

- Village
- Location within Poland
- Coordinates: 50°42′39″N 21°52′19″E
- Country: Poland
- Voivodeship: Subcarpathian
- County: Stalowa Wola
- Gmina: Radomyśl nad Sanem

Czekaj Pniowski [ˈt͡ʂɛkai̯ ˈpɲɔfski] is a village in the administrative district of Gmina Radomyśl nad Sanem, within Stalowa Wola County, Subcarpathian Voivodeship, in south-eastern Poland.
