= Pniów, Podkarpackie Voivodeship =

Pniów
- Village
- Location within Poland
- Coordinates: 50°43′N 21°53′E
- Country: Poland
- Voivodeship: Subcarpathian
- County: Stalowa Wola
- Gmina: Radomyśl nad Sanem
- Population: 300

Pniów [pɲuf] is a village in the administrative district of Gmina Radomyśl nad Sanem, within Stalowa Wola County, Subcarpathian Voivodeship, in south-eastern Poland. It was founded in the 14th century, presumably by Polish king Kazimierz the Great.

In 2006 the village had an approximate population of 330.
