= Nowiny, Podkarpackie Voivodeship =

Nowiny
- Village
- Location within Poland
- Coordinates: 50°42′N 21°53′E
- Country: Poland
- Voivodeship: Subcarpathian
- County: Stalowa Wola
- Gmina: Radomyśl nad Sanem

Nowiny [nɔˈvinɨ] is a village in the administrative district of Gmina Radomyśl nad Sanem, within Stalowa Wola County, Subcarpathian Voivodeship, in south-eastern Poland.
