= Antoniów, Podkarpackie Voivodeship =

Antoniów
- Village
- Location within Poland
- Coordinates: 50°43′N 21°54′E
- Country: Poland
- Voivodeship: Subcarpathian
- County: Stalowa Wola
- Gmina: Radomyśl nad Sanem

Antoniów [anˈtɔɲuf] is a village in the administrative district of Gmina Radomyśl nad Sanem, within Stalowa Wola County, Subcarpathian Voivodeship, in south-eastern Poland.
