= Zdziechowice Drugie =

- Village
- Location within Poland
- Coordinates: 50°47′16″N 22°06′39″E
- Country: Poland
- Voivodeship: Podkarpackie
- County: Stalowa Wola
- Gmina: Zaklików

Zdziechowice Drugie [zd͡ʑɛxɔˈvit͡sɛ ˈdruɡʲɛ] is a village in the administrative district of Gmina Zaklików, within Stalowa Wola County, Podkarpackie Voivodeship, in south-eastern Poland.
