= Dąbrowa, Stalowa Wola County =

Dąbrowa
- Village
- Location within Poland
- Coordinates: 50°46′00″N 22°09′14″E
- Country: Poland
- Voivodeship: Podkarpackie
- County: Stalowa Wola
- Gmina: Zaklików

Dąbrowa [dɔmˈbrɔva] is a village in the administrative district of Gmina Zaklików, within Stalowa Wola County, Podkarpackie Voivodeship, in south-eastern Poland.
