= Studzieniec, Podkarpackie Voivodeship =

Studzieniec
- Village
- Location within Poland
- Coordinates: 50°36′02″N 22°12′14″E
- Country: Poland
- Voivodeship: Subcarpathian
- County: Stalowa Wola
- Gmina: Pysznica

Studzieniec [stuˈd͡ʑɛɲɛt͡s] is a village in the administrative district of Gmina Pysznica, within Stalowa Wola County, Subcarpathian Voivodeship, in south-eastern Poland.
