= Musików =

- Village
- Location within Poland
- Coordinates: 50°37′56″N 22°4′28″E
- Country: Poland
- Voivodeship: Subcarpathian
- County: Stalowa Wola
- Gmina: Radomyśl nad Sanem
- Population: 160 (2,013)

Musików [muˈɕikuf] is a village in the administrative district of Gmina Radomyśl nad Sanem, within Stalowa Wola County, Subcarpathian Voivodeship, in south-eastern Poland.
