= Olszowiec, Podkarpackie Voivodeship =

Olszowiec
- Village
- Location within Poland
- Coordinates: 50°33′N 22°9′E
- Country: Poland
- Voivodeship: Subcarpathian
- County: Stalowa Wola
- Gmina: Pysznica
- Population: 531

Olszowiec [ɔlˈʂɔvjɛt͡s] is a village in the administrative district of Gmina Pysznica, within Stalowa Wola County, Subcarpathian Voivodeship, in south-eastern Poland.
