= Łążek Chwałowicki =

Łążek Chwałowski
- Village
- Location within Poland
- Coordinates: 50°46′19″N 21°58′13″E
- Country: Poland
- Voivodeship: Subcarpathian
- County: Stalowa Wola
- Gmina: Radomyśl nad Sanem
- Population: 110

Łążek Chwałowski [ˈwɔ̃ʐɛk xfawɔˈvski] is a village in the administrative district of Gmina Radomyśl nad Sanem, within Stalowa Wola County, Subcarpathian Voivodeship, in south-eastern Poland. The village is located in the historical region Galicia.
