= Rzeczyca Długa =

- Village
- Location within Poland
- Coordinates: 50°38′N 22°4′E
- Country: Poland
- Voivodeship: Subcarpathian
- County: Stalowa Wola
- Gmina: Radomyśl nad Sanem
- Population (approx.): 800
- Website: www.rzeczyca-długa.pl

Rzeczyca Długa [ʐɛˈt͡ʂɨt͡sa ˈdwuɡa] is a village in the administrative district of Gmina Radomyśl nad Sanem, within Stalowa Wola County, Subcarpathian Voivodeship, in south-eastern Poland. The village is located in the historical region Galicia.
