= Laski, Bojanów County =

Laski
- Village
- Location within Poland
- Coordinates: 50°25′N 21°59′E
- Country: Poland
- Voivodeship: Subcarpathian
- County: Stalowa Wola
- Gmina: Bojanów

Laski (Polish pronunciation: [ˈlaskʲi]) is a village in the administrative district of Gmina Bojanów, within Stalowa Wola County, Subcarpathian Voivodeship, in south-eastern Poland.
