= Chłopska Wola =

- Village
- Location within Poland
- Coordinates: 50°35′44″N 22°4′30″E
- Country: Poland
- Voivodeship: Subcarpathian
- County: Stalowa Wola
- Gmina: Pysznica
- Population: 164

Chłopska Wola [ˈxwɔpska ˈvɔla] is a village in the administrative district of Gmina Pysznica, within Stalowa Wola County, Subcarpathian Voivodeship, in south-eastern Poland.

== See also ==
- Chłopska Kępa
- Wola, for other uses of the word
