= Łążek, Podkarpackie Voivodeship =

Łążek
- Village
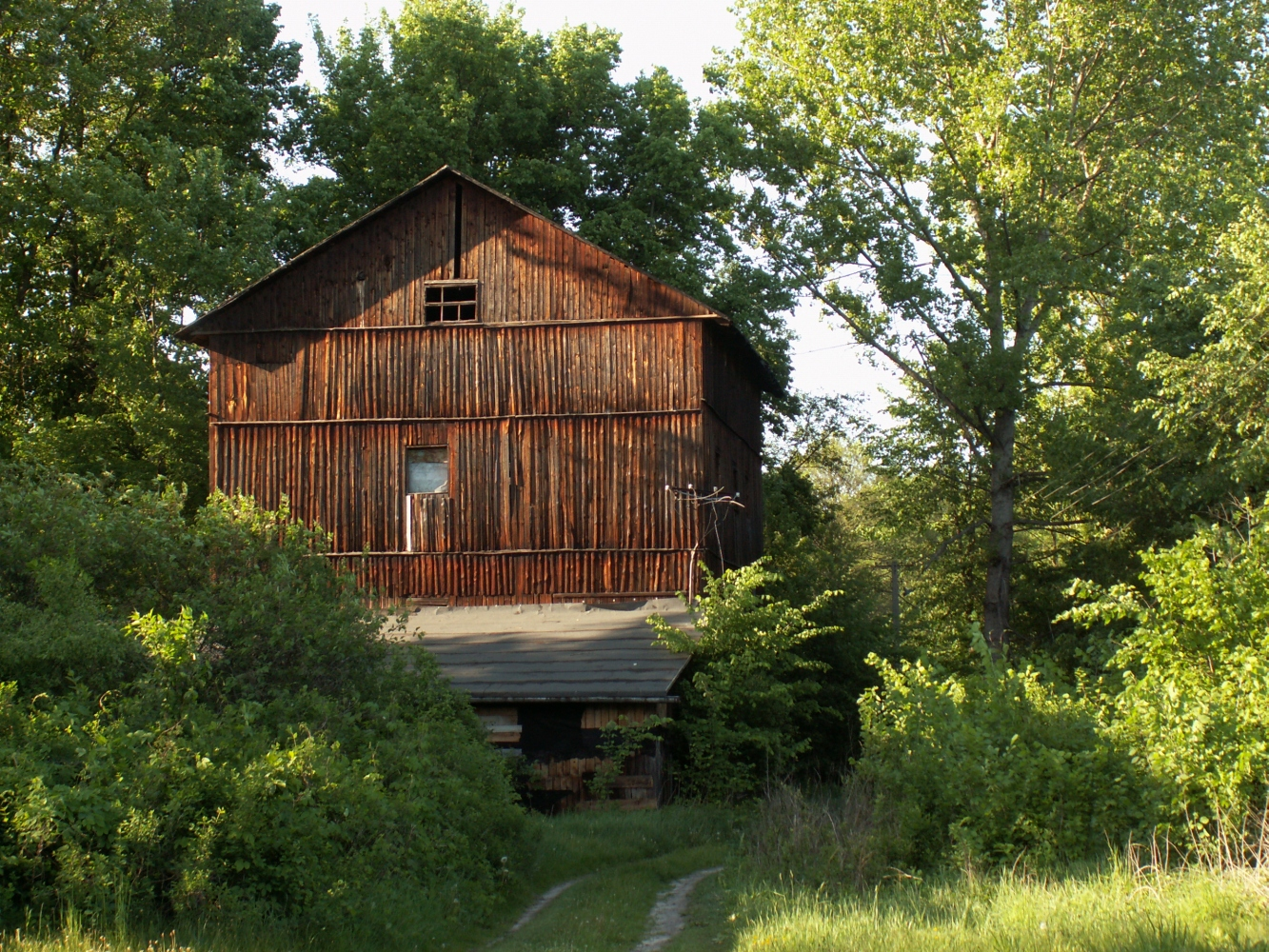
- Old water mill on Sanna river in Łążek

- Location within Poland
- Coordinates: 50°46′N 22°0′E
- Country: Poland
- Voivodeship: Subcarpathian
- County: Stalowa Wola
- Gmina: Zaklików
- Time zone: UTC+1 (CET)
  - Summer (DST): UTC+2 (CEST)
- Postal code: 37-470
- Vehicle registration: RST

Łążek [ˈwɔ̃ʐɛk] is a village in the administrative district of Gmina Zaklików, within Stalowa Wola County, Subcarpathian Voivodeship, in south-eastern Poland. It is situated on the Sanna River

According to the 1921 census, Łążek with the adjacent forester's lodge had a population of 322, entirely Polish by nationality and Roman Catholic by confession.
