= Lipa, Stalowa Wola County =

Village in Poland

Lipa
- Village
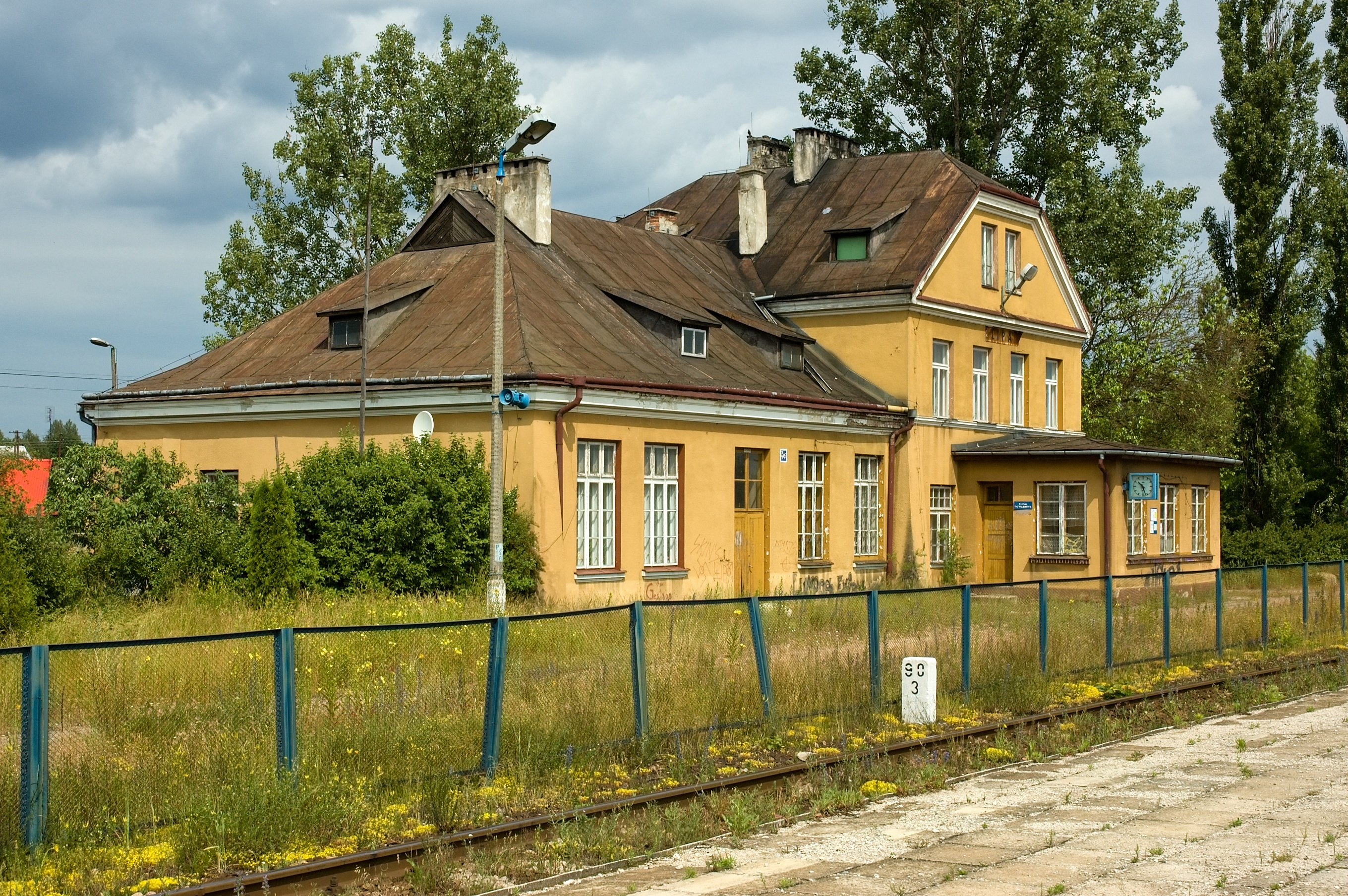
- The village's railway station

- Location within Poland
- Coordinates: 50°41′19″N 22°3′53″E
- Country: Poland
- Voivodeship: Subcarpathian
- County: Stalowa Wola
- Gmina: Zaklików
- Time zone: UTC+1 (CET)
  - Summer (DST): UTC+2 (CEST)
- Postal code: 37-470
- Vehicle registration: RST

Lipa [ˈlipa] is a village in the administrative district of Gmina Zaklików, within Stalowa Wola County, Subcarpathian Voivodeship, in south-eastern Poland.

According to the 1921 census, Lipa had a population of 914, 99.9% Polish by nationality.
