= Łysaków, Stalowa Wola County =

Łysaków
- Village
- Location within Poland
- Coordinates: 50°45′32″N 22°10′55″E
- Country: Poland
- Voivodeship: Podkarpackie
- County: Stalowa Wola
- Gmina: Zaklików
- Time zone: UTC+1 (CET)
  - Summer (DST): UTC+2 (CEST)
- Postal code: 37-470
- Vehicle registration: RST

Łysaków [wɨˈsakuf] is a village in the administrative district of Gmina Zaklików, within Stalowa Wola County, Podkarpackie Voivodeship, in south-eastern Poland.

== History ==
It was a possession of the Łysakowski, Tarnowski and Potocki families.

According to the 1921 census, the population was entirely Polish by nationality and Roman Catholic by confession.

Following the German-Soviet invasion of Poland, which started World War II in September 1939, the village was occupied by Germany. In 1941, the Germans established a forced labour camp for Jews and Poles in the village. Nearly 700 prisoners passed through the camp. In 1943, the Germans dissolved the camp, and then deported the Poles elsewhere, and massacred the Jews in an unknown location.
