= Zygmunt Ajdukiewicz =

Polish painter

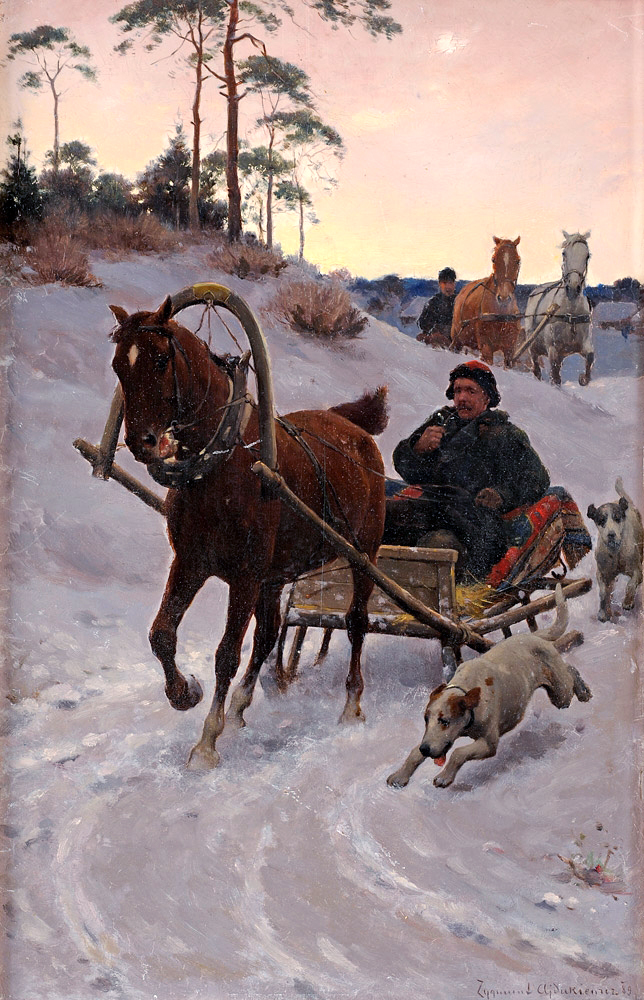
- Kulig
- Born: Zygmunt Ajdukiewicz; 22 January 1861; Witkowice
- Died: April 29, 1917 (aged 56); Vienna
- Known for: Painter
- Notable work: Encyclopedia: The Austro-Hungarian Monarchy in Word and Picture (Die österreichisch-ungarische Monarchie in Wort und Bild)
- Movement: Realism
- Awards: 1891 Gold Medal in Vienna and in Berlin and at 1898 Vienna exhibitions, 1894 Silver Medal in Lwów (Lemberg)

Zygmunt Ajdukiewicz (22 January 1861 – 29 April 1917) was a Polish realist painter of the late 19th century specializing in portraits, genre and historical painting. Ajdukiewicz, was born and raised in Galicia, settled in the imperial capital upon the completion of his studies, but maintained a close connection with his homeland. While in Vienna, he illustrated the epic novel The Deluge (Potop) by Polish Nobel Prize-winning novelist Henryk Sienkiewicz.

== Biography ==
Ajdukiewicz was born in Witkowice near Tarnobrzeg in Austrian Galicia. He studied painting at the Kraków Academy of Fine Arts originally. From 1880 to 1882, he studied at the Academy of Vienna and, from 1883 at the Munich Academy under Johann Herterich, associated with the Munich School of naturalism. He settled permanently in Vienna in 1885 as popular painter of the Austrian court where he was also referred to as Zygismund or Sigismund von Ajdukiewicz. In 1893 he went to Paris. Back in Vienna, he worked on a long series of original artwork for the 24-volume encyclopedia initiated and sponsored by Prince Rudolf as evidence of his imperial achievements (Kronprinzenwerk). It was a major publishing project printed in German and Hungarian between 1886 and 1902 under the title Austro-Hungarian Monarchy in Word and Picture. Subsequent volumes were published long after Rudolf's death which took place in January 1889. Ajdukiewicz painted panels for the encyclopedia depicting various nationalities, ethnic groups and minorities represented in Austria-Hungary. He also produced a series of 12 paintings about the life of Tadeusz Kościuszko published in 1892 as an art-album by F. Bondy. He made a life-size standing portrait of Archduke Franz Ferdinand as a hunter (1913).

=== Recognition ===
Ajdukiewicz exhibited in Kraków, Warsaw, Lwów, Vienna, Berlin, Munich and Prague. His paintings received top awards at international art exhibitions including Gold Medal in Vienna and Gold Medal Second Class in Berlin in 1891, as well as the 1898 Gold Medal Second Class in Vienna and Silver Medal at the 1894 competition in Lwów (Lemberg). His works can be found in numerous museums and national art galleries across Poland such as the National Museum in Warsaw, Kraków, Wrocław, state collections at the royal Wawel and, Museum of Upper Silesia in Bytom, but also at the Viennese Historical Museum. Ajdukiewicz was the first cousin of Polish fin de siècle painter Tadeusz Ajdukiewicz who was nine years older than him. He died in Vienna in 1917.

Selected oil paintings
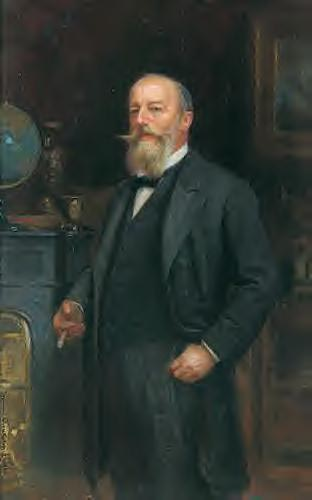
Adolf Wiesenburg

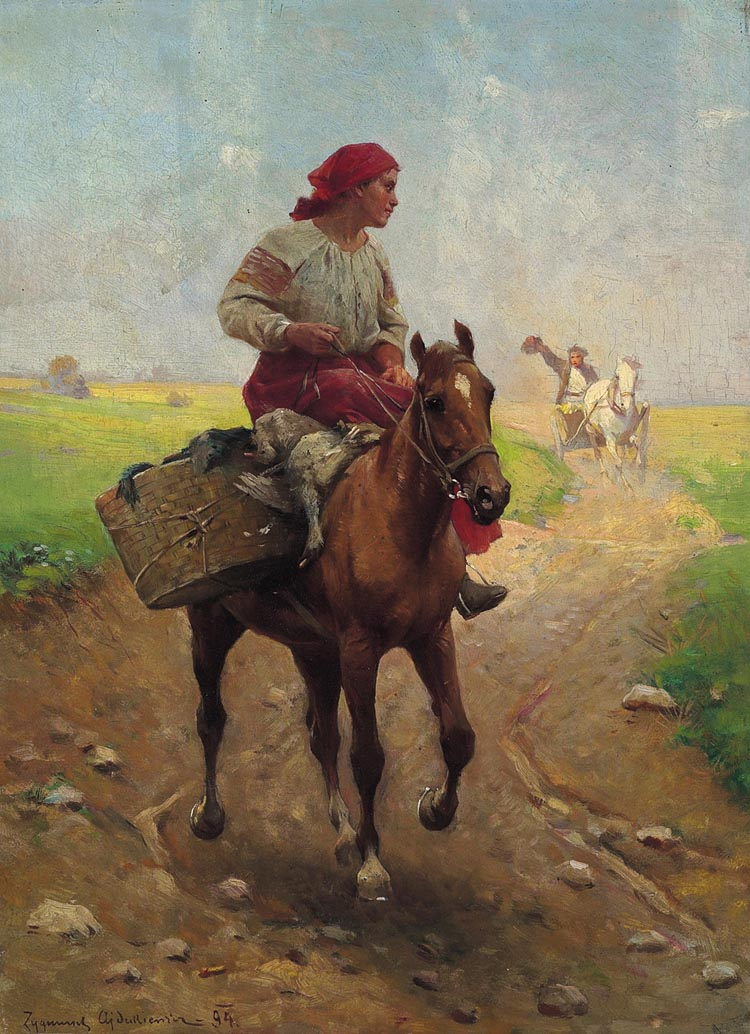
To Market

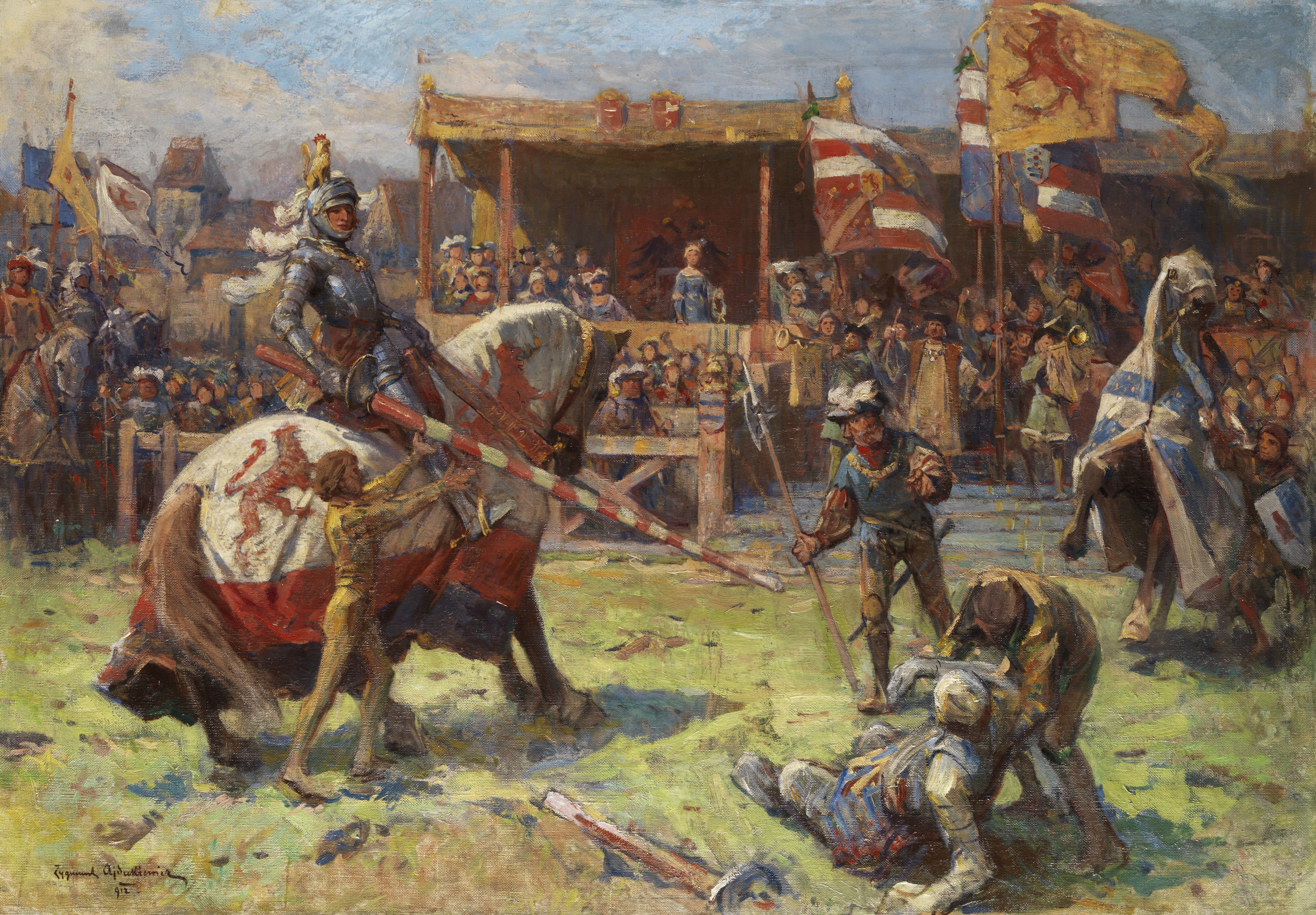
Tournament

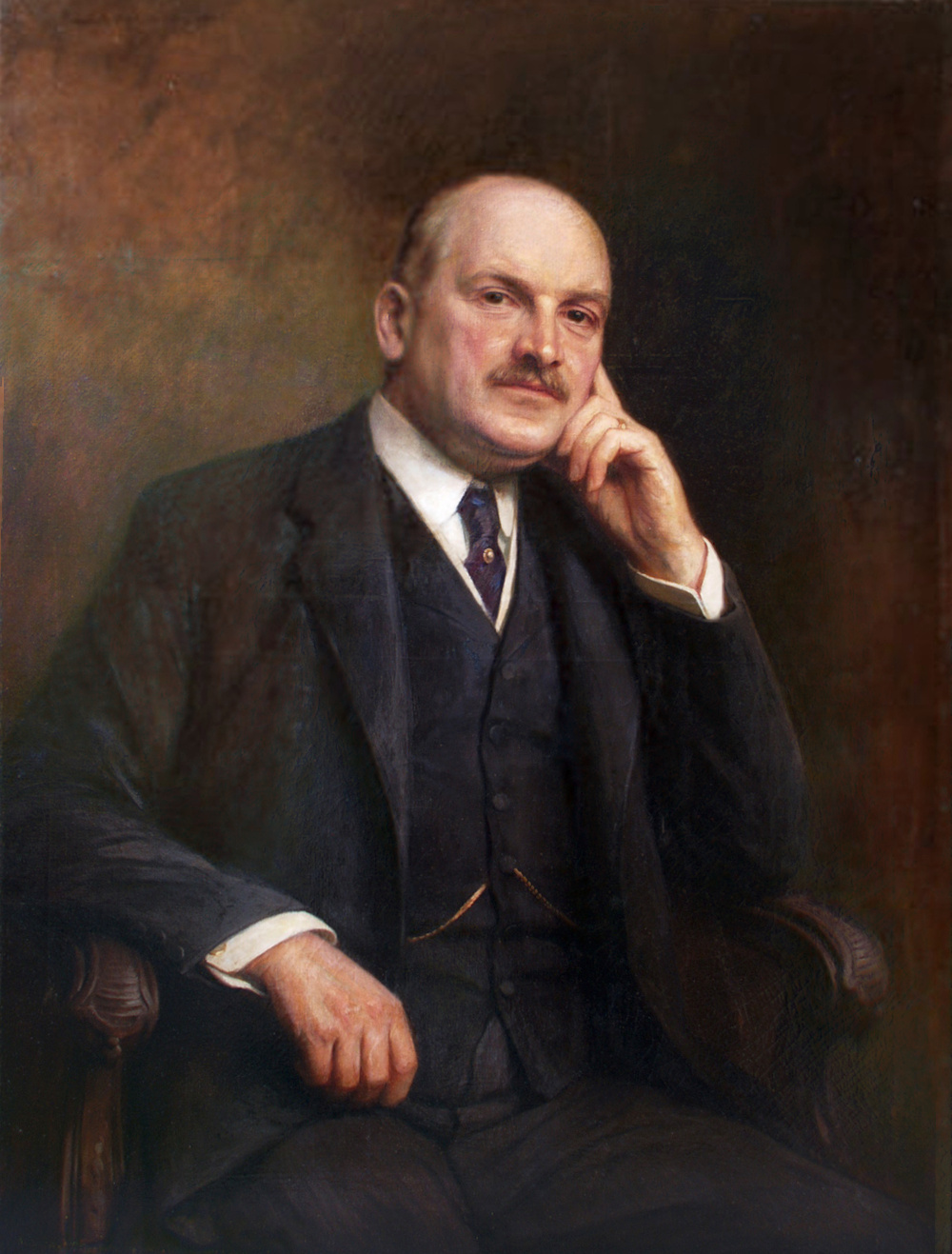
Portrait of a Man

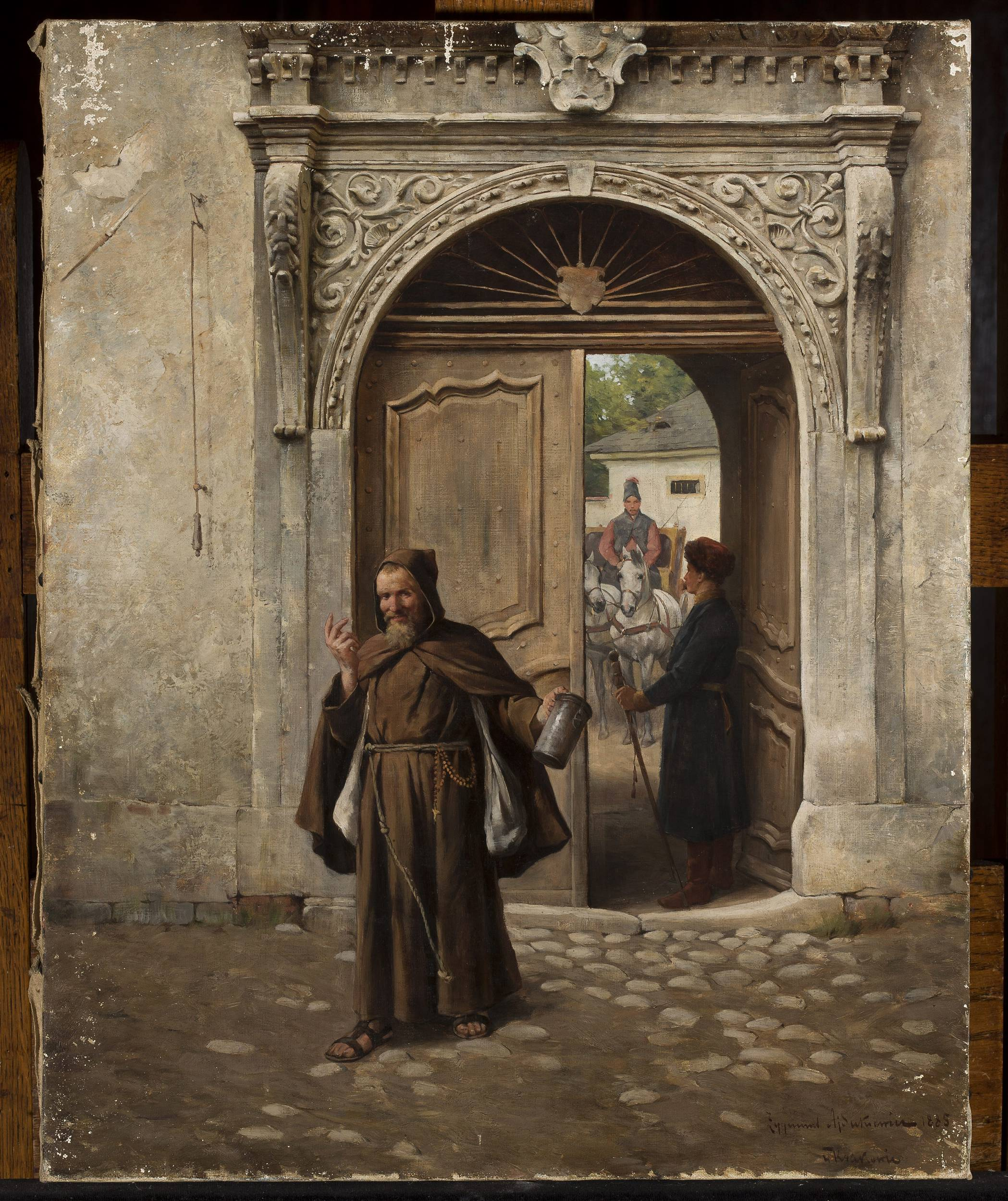
Generous alms
Selected plates from Kronprinzenwerk Encyclopedia of Austria-Hungary
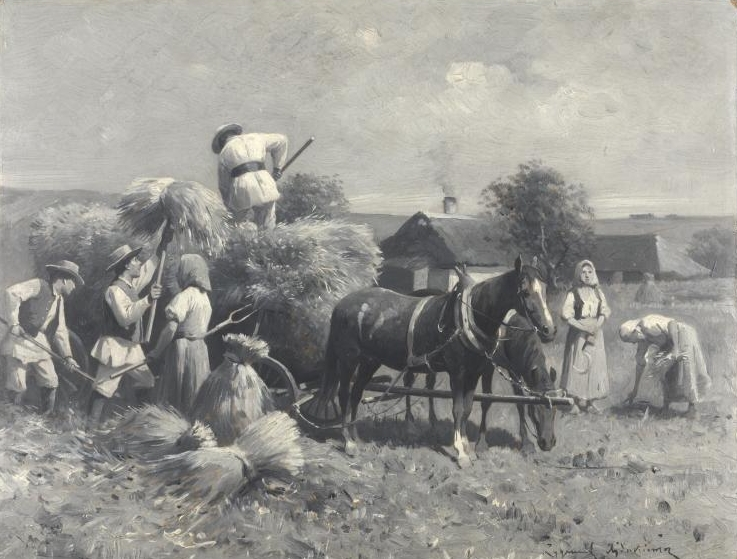
Harvest

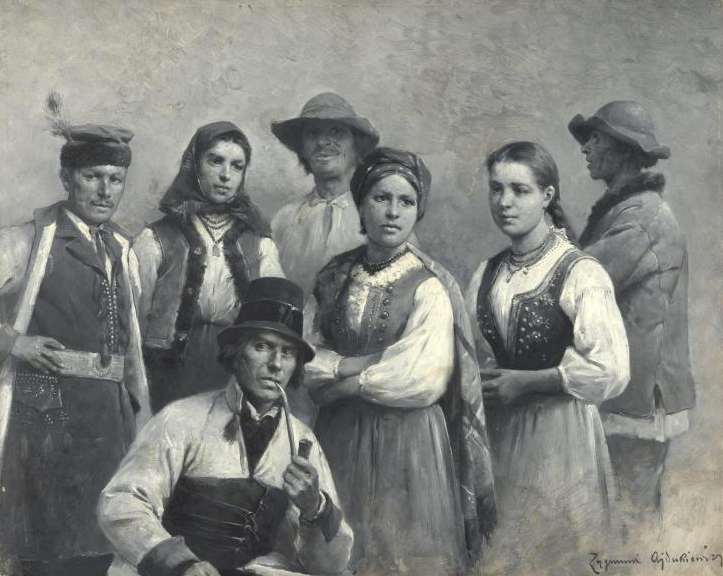
Highlanders

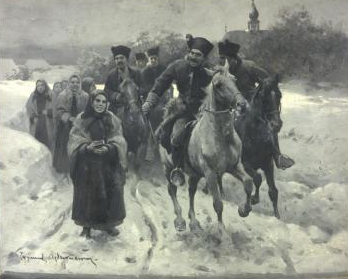
Christmas Ride

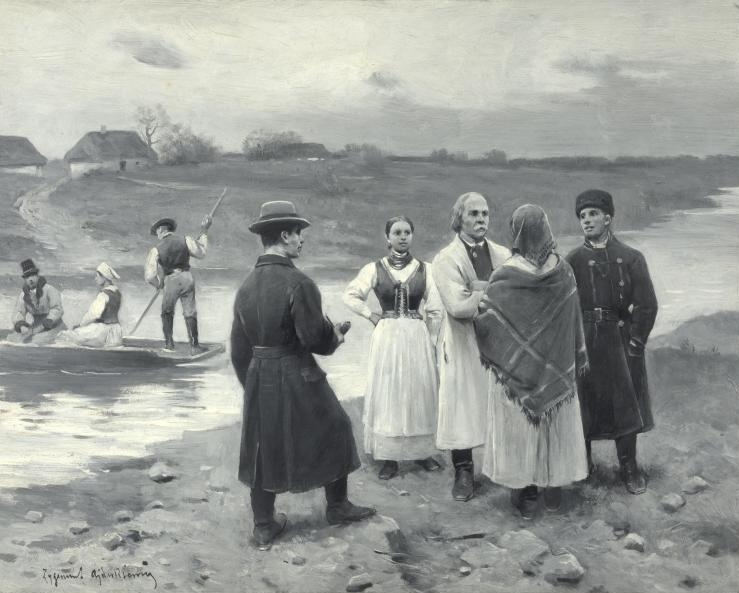
Powislanie

== See also ==
- List of Polish painters

== Notes and references ==
- Paul Pfisterer (1995). Monogram: Ajdukiewicz, Zygismund (ZA 66, ZA 67). Walter de Gruyter. p. 862. ISBN 9783110143003.
