= Krzaki, Podkarpackie Voivodeship =

Krzaki
- Village
- Location within Poland
- Coordinates: 50°32′54″N 22°12′13″E
- Country: Poland
- Voivodeship: Subcarpathian
- County: Stalowa Wola
- Gmina: Pysznica

Krzaki [ˈkʂaki] is a village in the administrative district of Gmina Pysznica, within Stalowa Wola County, Subcarpathian Voivodeship, in south-eastern Poland.
