= Józefów, Stalowa Wola County =

Józefów
- Village
- Location within Poland
- Coordinates: 50°48′N 22°4′E
- Country: Poland
- Voivodeship: Subcarpathian
- County: Stalowa Wola
- Gmina: Zaklików
- Time zone: UTC+1 (CET)
  - Summer (DST): UTC+2 (CEST)
- Postal code: 37-470
- Vehicle registration: RST

Józefów (Polish pronunciation: [juˈzɛfuf]) is a village in the administrative district of Gmina Zaklików, within Stalowa Wola County, Subcarpathian Voivodeship, in south-eastern Poland.

According to the 1921 census, the village had a population of 15, entirely Polish by nationality and Roman Catholic by confession.
