= Karkówka, Podkarpackie Voivodeship =

Karkówka
- Village
- Location within Poland
- Coordinates: 50°47′N 22°8′E
- Country: Poland
- Voivodeship: Subcarpathian
- County: Stalowa Wola
- Gmina: Zaklików

Population
  - Total: 220
- Time zone: UTC+1 (CET)
  - Summer (DST): UTC+2 (CEST)
- Postal code: 37-470
- Vehicle registration: RST

Karkówka [karˈkufka] is a village in the administrative district of Gmina Zaklików, within Stalowa Wola County, Subcarpathian Voivodeship, in south-eastern Poland.

According to the 1921 census, the village had a population of 92, entirely Polish by nationality and Roman Catholic by confession.
