= Ruda, Stalowa Wola County =

Ruda
- Village
- Location within Poland
- Coordinates: 50°30′4″N 21°59′38″E
- Country: Poland
- Voivodeship: Subcarpathian
- County: Stalowa Wola
- Gmina: Bojanów

Ruda [ˈruda] is a village in the administrative district of Gmina Bojanów, within Stalowa Wola County, Subcarpathian Voivodeship, in south-eastern Poland.
