= Kruszyna, Podkarpackie Voivodeship =

Kruszyna
- Village
- Location within Poland
- Coordinates: 50°39′48″N 22°7′55″E
- Country: Poland
- Voivodeship: Subcarpathian
- County: Stalowa Wola
- Gmina: Zaklików

Kruszyna [kruˈʂɨna] is a village in the administrative district of Gmina Zaklików, within Stalowa Wola County, Subcarpathian Voivodeship, in south-eastern Poland.
