= Sudoły, Podkarpackie Voivodeship =

Sudoły
- Village
- Location within Poland
- Coordinates: 50°34′N 22°6′E
- Country: Poland
- Voivodeship: Subcarpathian
- County: Stalowa Wola
- Gmina: Pysznica

Sudoły [suˈdɔwɨ] is a village in the administrative district of Gmina Pysznica, within Stalowa Wola County, Subcarpathian Voivodeship, in south-eastern Poland.
