= Zdziechowice Pierwsze =

- Village
- Location within Poland
- Coordinates: 50°48′06″N 22°06′40″E
- Country: Poland
- Voivodeship: Podkarpackie
- County: Stalowa Wola
- Gmina: Zaklików

Zdziechowice Pierwsze [zd͡ʑɛxɔˈvit͡sɛ ˈpjɛrfʂɛ] is a village in the administrative district of Gmina Zaklików, within Stalowa Wola County, Podkarpackie Voivodeship, in south-eastern Poland.
