= Cisów Las =

- Village
- Location within Poland
- Coordinates: 50°23′30″N 22°00′07″E
- Country: Poland
- Voivodeship: Subcarpathian
- County: Stalowa Wola
- Gmina: Bojanów

Cisów Las [ˈt͡ɕisuf ˈlas] is a village in the administrative district of Gmina Bojanów, within Stalowa Wola County, Subcarpathian Voivodeship, in south-eastern Poland.
