= Luftflotte 6 =

Luftflotte 6 (Air Fleet 6) was one of the primary divisions of the German Luftwaffe in World War II. It was formed on May 5, 1943 from Luftwaffenkommando Ost in Central Russia (Smolensk). The Luftwaffe units listed here were detached in Belarus, East Poland, East Prussia, Ukraine, Slovakia and in Russian-occupied lands for air support of Axis forces in the sector; with command offices in Pryluky and Belarus during June 26, 1944 within the Eastern front.

== Strategical reconnaissance ==
- Stab/FAGr.2 (Baranovichi)
- 1.(F)/11 (Baranovichi)
- 1.(F)/14 (Baranovichi)
- NSt.4 (Bobruisk)

== Bombers (Medium/Heavy) ==
- 14.(Eis)/KG.3 (Puchivichi)
- Stab/KG.1 Hindenburg (Prohwehren)
- II./KG.1 Hindenburg (Prohwehren)

== Strategical reconnaissance ==
- 1(F)/100 (Pinsk)

== Tactical reconnaissance ==
- Stab/NAGr.4 (Biała Podlaska)
- 3/NAGr.4 (Kobryn)
- 12/NAGr.4 (Brest-Litovsk)

== Bombers (Medium) ==
- 10.(Kroat)KG.3 (Smolensk)
- Stab/KG.4 (Białystok)
- II./KG.4 (Baranovichi)
- III./KG.4 (Baranovichi)
- Stab/KG.27 (Krosno)
- I./KG.27 (Krosno)
- II./KG.27 (Krosno)
- III./KG.27 (Mielec)
- Stab./KG.53 (Radom)
- I./KG.53 (Radom)
- II./KG.53 (Piastov)
- III./KG.53 (Radom)
- Stab./KG.55 (Dęblin-Irena)
- I./KG.55 (Dęblin-Ułęż)
- II./KG.55 (Dęblin-Irena)
- III./KG.55 (Groyek)

== 1.Fliegerdivision (1° Air Division) Orscha ==
=== Tactical reconnaissance ===
- Stab/NAGr.10 (Toloschin)
- 2/NAGr.4 (Orscha)
- 13/NaGr.14 (Toloschin)

=== Tactical support ===
- III./St. G.77 (Smolensk)
- I.(Kroat)ST.G. 1 (Eichwalde)

=== Land air strike ===
- I/SG.1 (Toloschin)
- II/SG.1 (Vinla)
- 10(Pz)/SG.1 (Boyari)
- 10(Pz)/SG.3 (Toloschin)
- Stab/SG.9 (Schippenbeil)
- Stab/SG.10 (Dokudovo)
- III/SG.10 (Dokudovo)

== Fliegerführer 1 (Flight Director 1) Minsk ==
=== Tactical reconnaissance ===
- 12./NAGr.12 (Mogilev)
- 2./NAGr.5 (Budslav)
- 4./NAGr.31 (Budslav)

=== Night land attack ===
- Stab/NSGr.2 (Lida)
- 1./NSGr.2 (Bobruisk)
- 3./NSGr.2 (Lida)
- 4./NSGr.2 (Mogilev)
- 1.Ostfl. St.(Russische) (Minsk)
- 1/NSGr.1 (Kovno)
- 2/NSGr.1 (Kovno)
- Stab I./Eins. Gr. Fl. Sch. Div. (Borisov)
- Russisch Lehr Fl. Div. (Borisov)
- 2/Eins. Gr. Fl. Sch Div. (Borisov)
- 3/Eins. Gr. Fl. Sch. Div. (Borisov)
- 1/Eins. Gr. Fl. Sch. Div. (Dubinskaya)

== Jagdabschnittführer 6 (Fighter Direction 6) Pryluky ==
=== Fighters ===
- I.Stab/JG.51 (Orscha)
- II.Stab./JG.51 (Orscha)
- I/JG.51 (Orscha)
- III./JG.51 (Bobruisk)
- IV./JG.51 (Mogilev)
- III./JG.11 (Dokudovo)

=== Night fighters ===
- I.Stab/NJG.100 (Baranovichi)
- 1./NJG.100 (Baranovichi)
- 1./NJG.100 (Biala-Podlaska)
- 1./NJG.100 (detach) (Baranovichi)
- 1./NJG.100 (Detach) (Dokudovo)
- 3./NJG.100 (Radom)
- 3./NJG.100 (Dokudovo)
- 4./NJG.100 (Puchivichi)

== Jagdabschnittführer Ostpreussen (Fighter Direction in East Prussia) Powunden ==
=== Fighters ===
- Stab/JG.52 (Königsberg)
- I./JG.52(Detach) (Königsberg)
- II./JG.52(Detach) (Königsberg)

=== Night fighters ===
- II./NJG.100 (Powunden)
- II./NJG.100 (Detach) (Eichwalde)
- II./NJG.100 (Detach) (Prohwehren)

== Luftwaffe special transport units (1944-45) ==
This unit was based in Muhldorf, Bavaria, which also included helicopters including:

- Focke-Achgelis Fa 223 Drachen
- Flettner Fl 265
- Flettner 282B Kolibri

For operations on the Western and Eastern front, the airfields in France (West) and East Prussia undertook some of the special liaisons, personnel transport, rescue of wounded personnel, observation/air patrol and other similar missions in the last days of the conflict.

- Transportstaffeln 40 (East area)

== Commanding officers ==
Flag for the Chief of a Luftflotte

- Generalfeldmarschall Robert Ritter von Greim, 5 May 1943 – 24 April 1945
- Generaloberst Otto Deßloch, 27 April 1945 – 8 May 1945

=== Chief of staff ===
- Generalmajor Friedrich Kless, 11 May 1943 – 8 May 1945
