= Żabno, Podkarpackie Voivodeship =

Żabno
- Village
- Location within Poland
- Coordinates: 50°40′N 21°58′E
- Country: Poland
- Voivodeship: Subcarpathian
- County: Stalowa Wola
- Gmina: Radomyśl nad Sanem
- Time zone: UTC+1 (CET)
  - Summer (DST): UTC+2 (CEST)

Żabno [ˈʐabnɔ] is a village in the administrative district of Gmina Radomyśl nad Sanem, within Stalowa Wola County, Subcarpathian Voivodeship, in south-eastern Poland.

Five Polish citizens were murdered by Nazi Germany in the village during World War II.
