= Rzeczyca Okrągła =

- Village
- Location within Poland
- Coordinates: 50°39′N 22°3′E
- Country: Poland
- Voivodeship: Subcarpathian
- County: Stalowa Wola
- Gmina: Radomyśl nad Sanem

Rzeczyca Okrągła [ʐɛˈt͡ʂɨt͡sa ɔˈkrɔŋɡwa] is a village in the administrative district of Gmina Radomyśl nad Sanem, within Stalowa Wola County, Subcarpathian Voivodeship, in south-eastern Poland.
