= Stare Baraki =

- Village
- Location within Poland
- Coordinates: 50°48′18″N 22°2′15″E
- Country: Poland
- Voivodeship: Subcarpathian
- County: Stalowa Wola
- Gmina: Zaklików
- Population: 200

Stare Baraki [ˈstarɛ baˈraki] is a village in the administrative district of Gmina Zaklików, within Stalowa Wola County, Subcarpathian Voivodeship, in south-eastern Poland.
