= Korabina =

- Village
- Location within Poland
- Coordinates: 50°24′15″N 21°58′9″E
- Country: Poland
- Voivodeship: Subcarpathian
- County: Stalowa Wola
- Gmina: Bojanów

Korabina [kɔraˈbina] is a village in the administrative district of Gmina Bojanów, within Stalowa Wola County, Subcarpathian Voivodeship, in south-eastern Poland.
