= Bąków, Podkarpackie Voivodeship =

Bąków
- Village
- Location within Poland
- Coordinates: 50°37′10″N 22°4′46″E
- Country: Poland
- Voivodeship: Subcarpathian
- County: Stalowa Wola
- Gmina: Pysznica
- Population: 190

Bąków [ˈbɔnkuf] is a village in the administrative district of Gmina Pysznica, within Stalowa Wola County, Subcarpathian Voivodeship, in south-eastern Poland.

As of 2008, the village had a population of 190.
