= Kłyżów =

- Village
- Location within Poland
- Coordinates: 50°32′51″N 22°09′52″E
- Country: Poland
- Voivodeship: Podkarpackie
- County: Stalowa Wola
- Gmina: Pysznica
- Population (approx.): 1,300

Kłyżów [ˈkwɨʐuf] is a village in the administrative district of Gmina Pysznica, within Stalowa Wola County, Podkarpackie Voivodeship, in south-eastern Poland.

Kłyżów has a football team called "GZS San Kłyżów" which play in the regional league. Kłyżów also has a Volunteer fire department
