= Avraham Hayim Shor =

Eastern European rabbi (died 1632)

Avraham Hayim ben Naphtali Hirsch Shor (Hebrew: אברהם חיים שור; died 1632), also spelled Abraham Ḥayyim Schor, was a Galician rabbi and Talmud commentator.

== Life ==
Shor was rabbi in Satanów and later in Belz, and, according to Joseph Lewinstein (in 'Ir Tehillah), also in Lemberg. He died at Belz, January 3 (or 23), 1632, and was buried in Lemberg.

== Works ==
Shor authored:

- Torat Ḥayyim (part i., Lublin, 1624; part ii., Cracow, 1636), novellæ on nine treatises of the Talmud;
- Ẓon Ḳodashim (Wandsbeck, 1729), notes on the Talmudic treatises of the order Kodashim, in collaboration with Mordecai Asher, rabbi of Brzezany;
- Ḳonṭres Bedeḳ ha-Bayit, notes on the part of the Shulchan Aruch, Even Ha'ezer that deals with divorces (hilkot giṭṭin), printed with Judah Aryeh ben David's Gur Aryeh (Amsterdam, 1733).

Shor is quoted by Benjamin Aaron Slonik in his responsa Mas'at Binyamin (No. 88), and by Joseph Solomon Delmedigo in his Elim.
