= Burdze =

- Village
- Location within Poland
- Coordinates: 50°30′55″N 21°58′36″E
- Country: Poland
- Voivodeship: Subcarpathian
- County: Stalowa Wola
- Gmina: Bojanów

Burdze (Polish pronunciation: [ˈburd͡zɛ]) is a village in the administrative district of Gmina Bojanów, within Stalowa Wola County, Subcarpathian Voivodeship, in south-eastern Poland.
