= Kępa Rzeczycka =

- Village
- Location within Poland
- Coordinates: 50°39′N 22°2′E
- Country: Poland
- Voivodeship: Subcarpathian
- County: Stalowa Wola
- Gmina: Radomyśl nad Sanem

Kępa Rzeczycka (Polish pronunciation: [ˈkɛmpa ʐɛˈt͡ʂɨt͡ska]) is a village in the administrative district of Gmina Radomyśl nad Sanem, within Stalowa Wola County, Subcarpathian Voivodeship, in south-eastern Poland.
