= Maziarnia, Stalowa Wola County =

Maziarnia
- Village
- Location within Poland
- Coordinates: 50°27′20″N 22°01′33″E
- Country: Poland
- Voivodeship: Podkarpackie
- County: Stalowa Wola
- Gmina: Bojanów

Maziarnia [maˈʑarɲa] is a village in the administrative district of Gmina Bojanów, within Stalowa Wola County, Podkarpackie Voivodeship, in south-eastern Poland.
