= Dąbrówka Pniowska =

- Village
- Location within Poland
- Coordinates: 50°44′N 21°52′E
- Country: Poland
- Voivodeship: Subcarpathian
- County: Stalowa Wola
- Gmina: Radomyśl nad Sanem
- Population: 353

Dąbrówka Pniowska [dɔmˈbrufka ˈpɲɔfska] is a village in the administrative district of Gmina Radomyśl nad Sanem, within Stalowa Wola County, Subcarpathian Voivodeship, in south-eastern Poland.
