= Słomiana, Podkarpackie Voivodeship =

Słomiana
- Village
- Location within Poland
- Coordinates: 50°33′59″N 22°12′23″E
- Country: Poland
- Voivodeship: Subcarpathian
- County: Stalowa Wola
- Gmina: Pysznica

Słomiana [swɔˈmjana] is a village in the administrative district of Gmina Pysznica, within Stalowa Wola County, Subcarpathian Voivodeship, in south-eastern Poland.
