= Antoniówka, Stalowa Wola County =

Antoniówka
- Village
- Location within Poland
- Coordinates: 50°46′6″N 22°8′16″E
- Country: Poland
- Voivodeship: Subcarpathian
- County: Stalowa Wola
- Gmina: Zaklików
- Population: 102

Antoniówka [antɔˈɲufka] is a village in the administrative district of Gmina Zaklików, within Stalowa Wola County, Subcarpathian Voivodeship, in south-eastern Poland.
