= Nowe Baraki =

- Village
- Location within Poland
- Coordinates: 50°47′35″N 22°01′26″E
- Country: Poland
- Voivodeship: Podkarpackie
- County: Stalowa Wola
- Gmina: Zaklików

Nowe Baraki [ˈnɔvɛ baˈraki] is a village in the administrative district of Gmina Zaklików, within Stalowa Wola County, Podkarpackie Voivodeship, in south-eastern Poland.
