= Ostrówek, Stalowa Wola County =

Ostrówek
- Village
- Location within Poland
- Coordinates: 50°45′45″N 21°51′47″E
- Country: Poland
- Voivodeship: Podkarpackie
- County: Stalowa Wola
- Gmina: Radomyśl nad Sanem

Ostrówek [ɔsˈtruvɛk] is a village in the administrative district of Gmina Radomyśl nad Sanem, within Stalowa Wola County, Podkarpackie Voivodeship, in south-eastern Poland.
