= Brandwica =

- Village
- Location within Poland
- Coordinates: 50°37′N 22°4′E
- Country: Poland
- Voivodeship: Subcarpathian
- County: Stalowa Wola
- Gmina: Pysznica

Brandwica [brandˈvit͡sa] is a village in the administrative district of Gmina Pysznica, within Stalowa Wola County, Subcarpathian Voivodeship, in south-eastern Poland.
