= The Austro-Hungarian Monarchy in Word and Picture =

Contemporaneous publication describing the Austro-Hungarian Empire

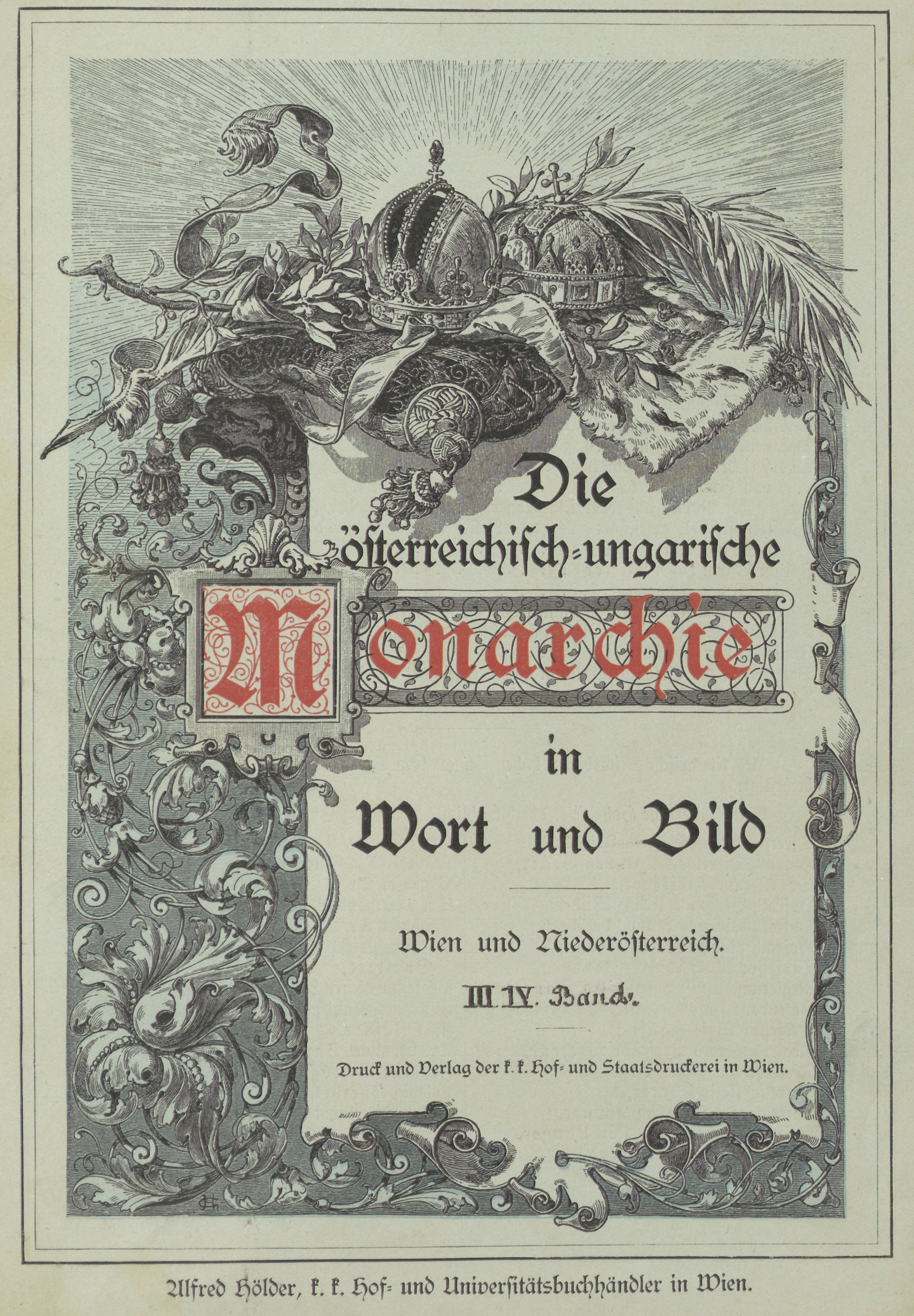
Title page of the first volume from 1886

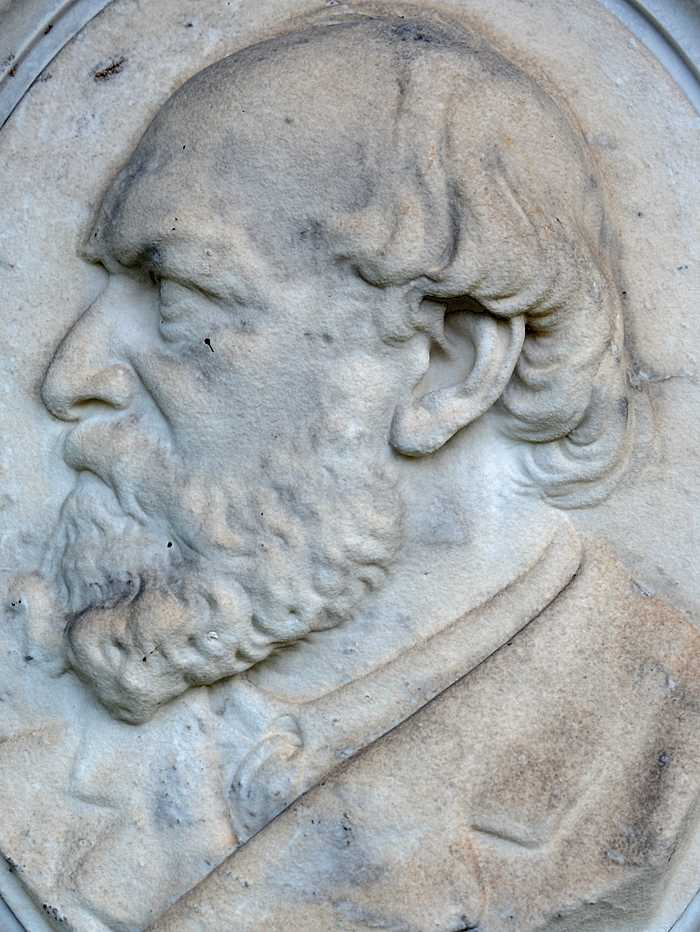
Relief of Josef Weil von Weilen from the Zentralfriedhof

The Austro-Hungarian Monarchy in Word and Picture or the Kronprinzenwerk ("Crown Prince's Work") is a 24-volume encyclopedia of regional studies, initiated in 1883 by Crown Prince Rudolf of Austria-Hungary.

The encyclopedia describes countries, peoples, landscapes and regions of the Austro-Hungarian Crown Lands. It was also published in a 21-volume Hungarian edition ("Az Osztrák-Magyar Monarchia írásban és képben"). The German edition was edited by the history and geography professor, Josef Weil von Weilen (1830-1889), while the Hungarian edition was edited by the novelist and dramatist Mór Jókai. Only the German edition was financially successful. The Hungarian edition includes some antisemitic remarks that are missing from the German edition.

The volumes were issued from December 1885 through June 1902 in 398 installments, from the "k.k. Hof- und Staatsdruckerei" (Court and State Printers) and Alfred von Hölder, a publisher and bookseller. They contain 587 contributions, totaling 12,596 pages with 4,529 illustrations. The articles were written by 432 contributors, including Crown Prince Rudolf himself.

== Volumes and dates ==
1. Vienna and Lower Austria, 1st section: Vienna (Wien und Niederösterreich, 1. Abtheilung: Wien), 1886
2. Summary 1. section: Nature Historical Theil (Übersichtsband, 1. Abtheilung: Naturgeschichtlicher Theil), 1887
3. Overview, 2nd section: Historical Theil (Übersichtsband, 2. Abtheilung: Geschichtlicher Theil), 1887
4. Vienna and Lower Austria, 2nd section: Lower Austria (Wien und Niederösterreich, 2. Abtheilung: Niederösterreich), 1888
5. Hungary, Part 1 (Ungarn, Band 1), 1888
6. Upper Austria and Salzburg (Oberösterreich und Salzburg), 1889
7. Styria (Steiermark), 1890
8. Carinthia and Krain (Kärnten und Krain), 1891
9. Hungary, Part 2 (Ungarn, Band 2), 1891
10. The Littoral (Gorizia, Gradiska, Trieste and Istria) (Das Küstenland (Görz, Gradiska, Triest und Istrien), 1891
11. Dalmatia (Dalmatien), 1892
12. Hungary, Part 3 (Ungarn, Band 3), 1893
13. Vorarlberg and the Tyrol (Tirol und Vorarlberg), 1893
14. Bohemia, Part 1 (Böhmen, Band 1), 1894
15. Bohemia, Part 2 (Böhmen, Band 2), 1896
16. Hungary, Part 4 (Ungarn, Band 4), 1896
17. Moravia and Silesia (Mähren und Schlesien), 1897
18. Hungary, Part 5, 1st section (Ungarn, Band 5, 1. Abtheilung), 1898
19. Galicia (Galicien), 1898
20. Bukovina (Bukowina), 1899
21. Hungary, Part 5, 2nd section (Ungarn, Band 5, 2. Abtheilung), 1900
22. Bosnia and Hercegovina (Bosnien und Hercegowina), 1901
23. Hungary, Part 6 (Ungarn, Band 6), 1902
24. Croatia and Slavonia (Croatien und Slavonien), 1902

The volume number corresponds to the list at the end of the 24th volume. Notably, Poland is not mentioned in the encyclopaedia because, at the time, the Imperial partitions of Poland were considered final by the German authorities in the Kingdom of Prussia as well as Austria-Hungary.

== Gallery ==
Selected plates from the Kronprinzenwerk Encyclopedia by Polish artist Zygmunt Ajdukiewicz.

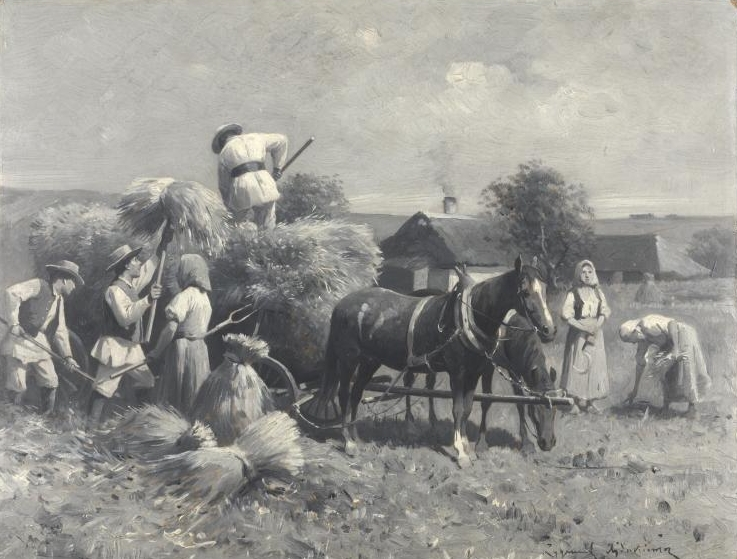
Harvest

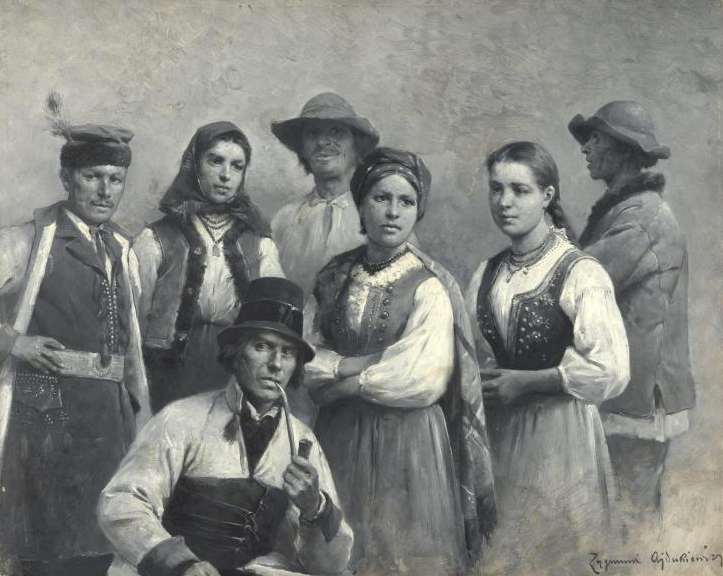
Highlanders

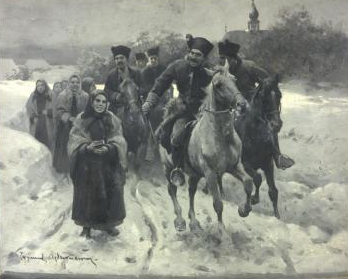
Christmas Ride

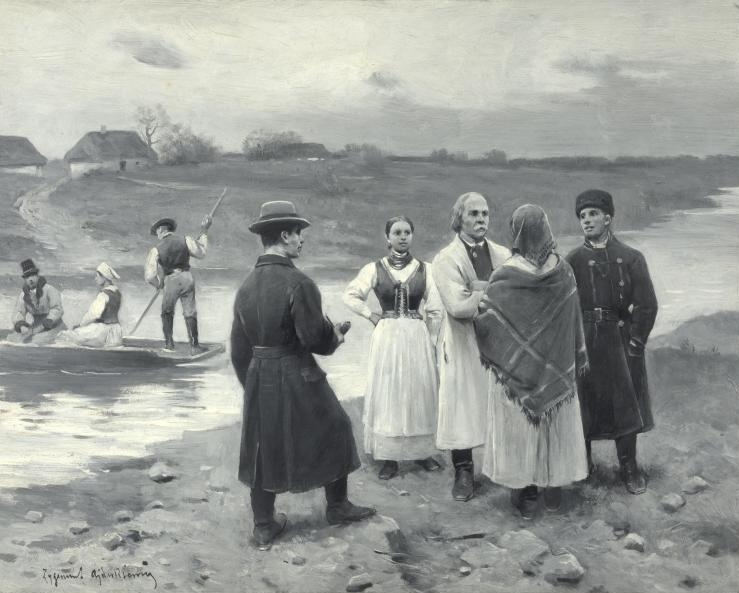
On the Vistula
Selected illustrations by other artists

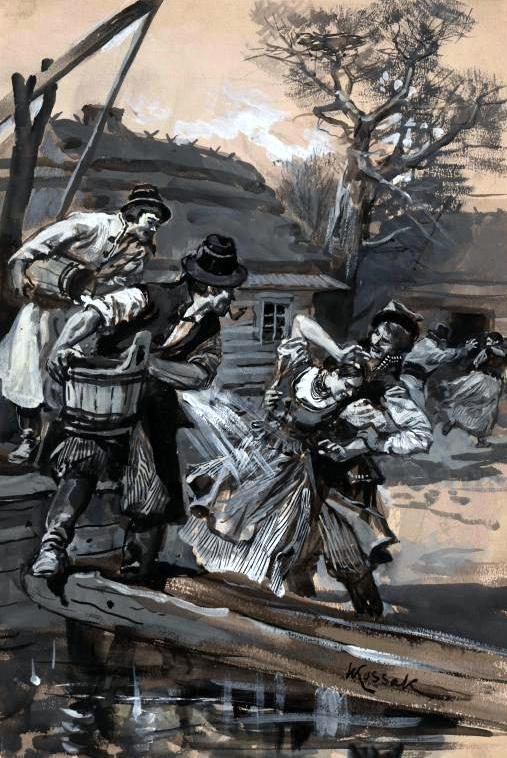
Water Affusion at Easter by Wojciech Kossak

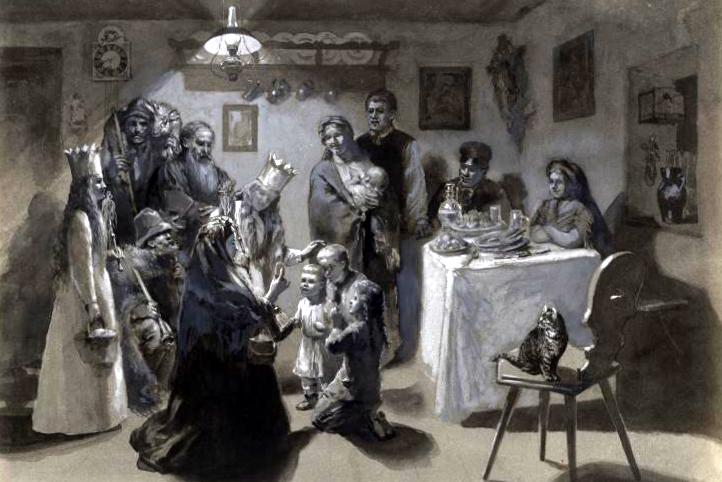
The Christ Child in Kuhländchen by
Rudolf Otto von Ottenfeld

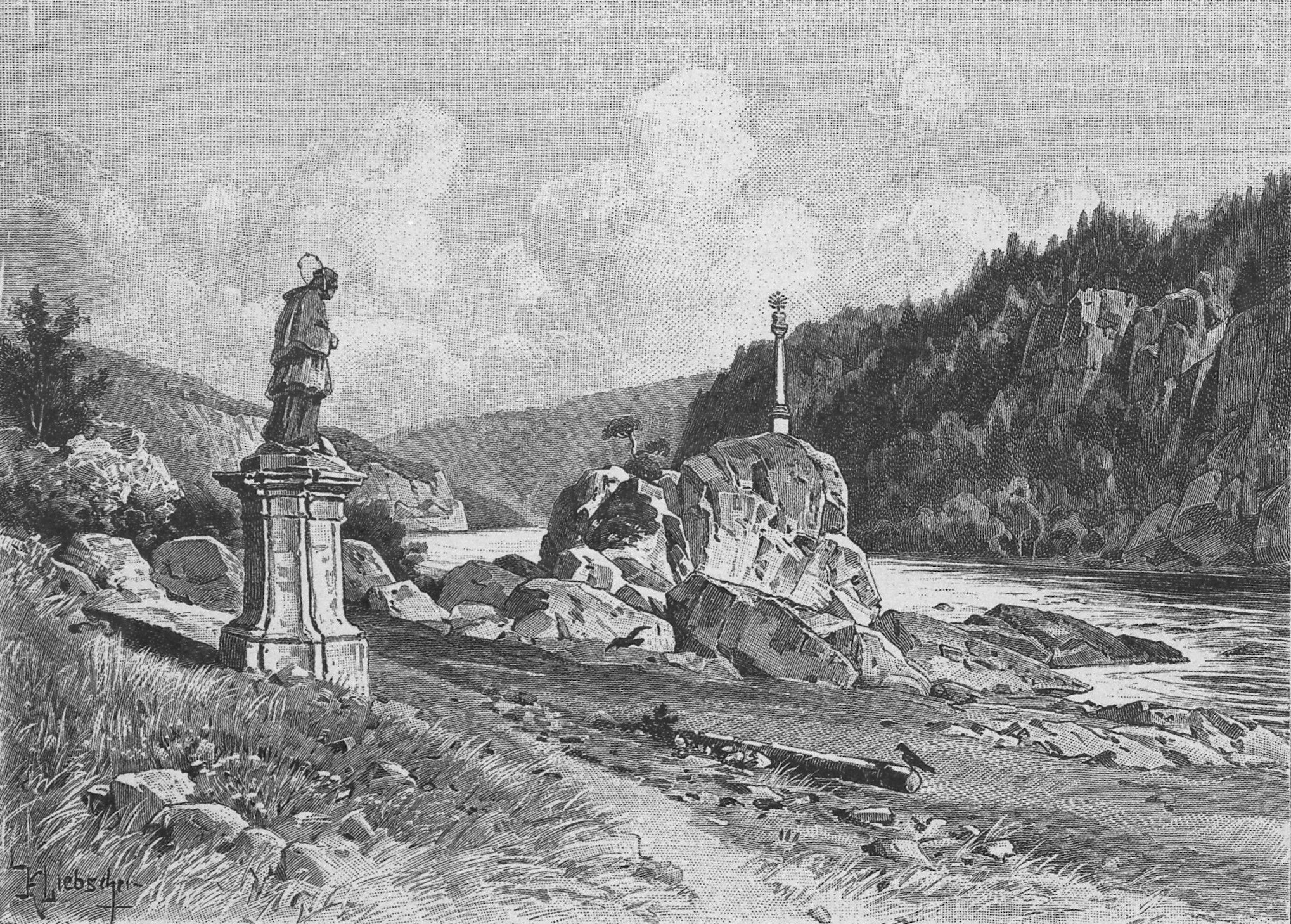
St John's Rapids by
Karel Liebscher

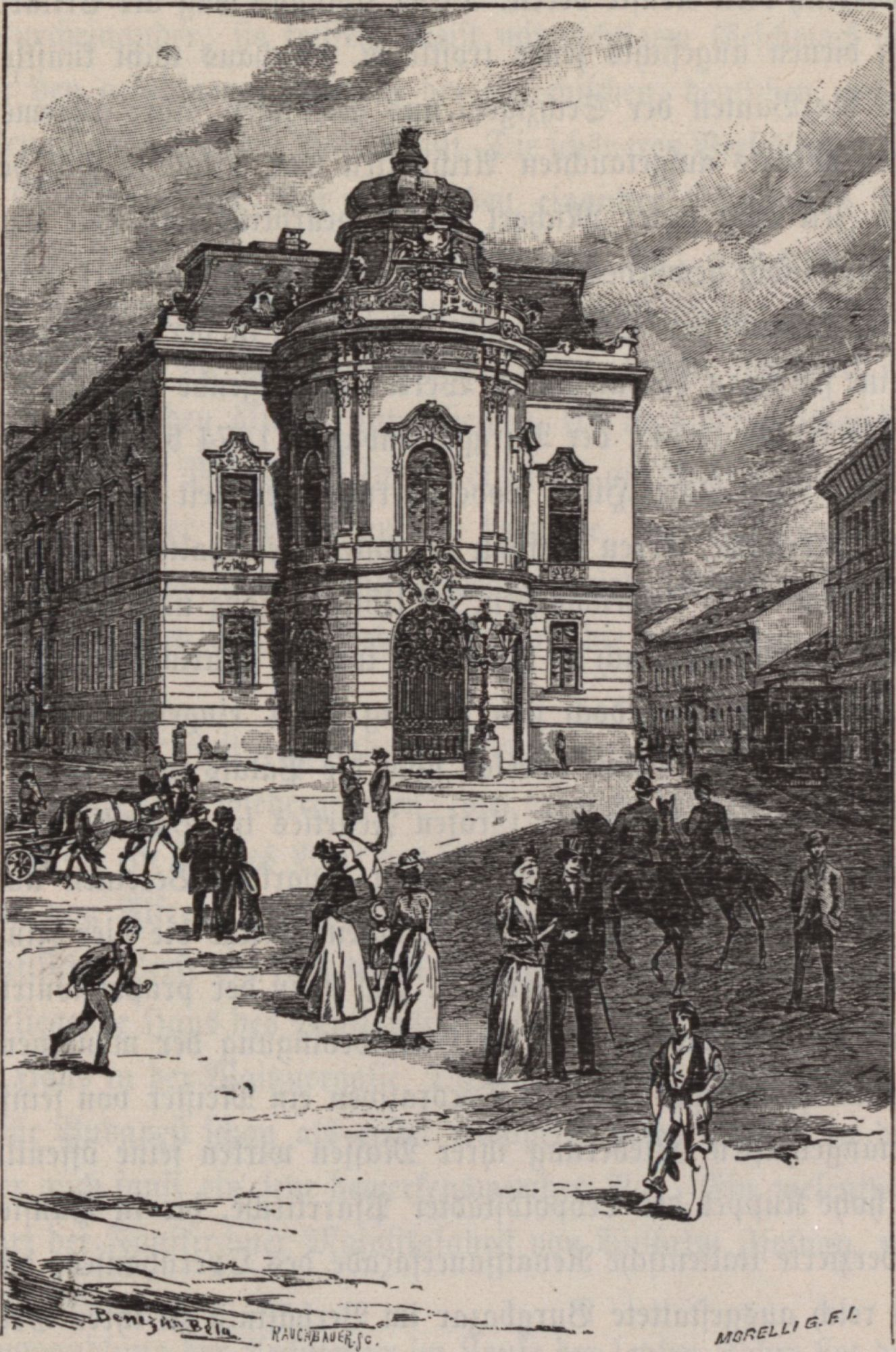
Wenckheim Palace by
Béla Benczúr

== See also ==
- List of encyclopedias by language
