= Stanisław Mielech =

Polish footballer (1894–1962)

Personal information
- Full name: Stanisław Feliks Mielech
- Date of birth: 29 April 1894
- Place of birth: Stany, Austria-Hungary (modern-day Poland)
- Date of death: 17 November 1962 (aged 68)
- Place of death: Warsaw, Poland
- Height: 1.72 m (5 ft 8 in)
- Position: Forward

Senior career*
Years	Team	Apps	(Gls)
–1910	Polonia Kraków		
1910–1911	Wisła Kraków		
1912–1915	Cracovia		
1916–1917	Drużyna Legionowa		
1917–1918	Korona Warsaw		
1919–1923	Cracovia		
1921	WKS Warsaw		
1923–1927	Legia Warsaw		

International career
1913	Galicia	1	(0)
1921–1922	Poland	2	(0)

Managerial career
- Korona Warsaw
- 1933: Legia Warsaw
- * Club domestic league appearances and goals

Stanisław Feliks Mielech (29 April 1894 – 17 November 1962) was a Polish footballer who played as a forward. He made two appearances for the Poland national team from 1921 to 1922.

From 1923 to 1927, he was associated with Legia Warsaw. He was the originator of the name of this club.

In December 2018, a plaque commemorating Stanisław Mielech was unveiled on the facade of the Polish Army Stadium in Warsaw.

== Honours ==
Cracovia

- Polish Football Championship: 1921
- Galician Football Championship: 1913
