= Przyszów =

- Village
- Location within Poland
- Coordinates: 50°29′3″N 21°59′34″E
- Country: Poland
- Voivodeship: Subcarpathian
- County: Stalowa Wola
- Gmina: Bojanów
- Website: http://przyszow.republika.pl/

Przyszów [ˈpʂɨʂuf] is a village in the administrative district of Gmina Bojanów, within Stalowa Wola County, Subcarpathian Voivodeship, in south-eastern Poland.

== Strażak Przyszów ==
Klub Sportowy Strażak Przyszów (lit. 'The Firefighter Przyszów Sports Club') was a Polish football club that was established in 2001. Their greatest success was playing in the regional league in 2009–2012. The club was dissolved after the B-class 2018–19 season.

== Przyszów Castle ==
The Przyszów Castle was a medieval royal castle located in the village of Przyszów. It had been built in the mid-14th century by Casimir the Great, but eventually the castle was destroyed by troops passing through around the year of 1624, it then continued to fall into disrepair from then on.

By 1752 the only 2 walls of the main building left were used as building material for the Capuchin monastery.

As of present, the grounds are private and not accessible to the public.
