= Gmina Bojanów =

Gmina Bojanów Bojanów Commune
- Gmina
- Coat of arms
- Interactive map of Gmina Bojanów
- Coordinates (Bojanów): 50°24′N 21°57′E
- Country: Poland
- Voivodeship: Subcarpathian
- County: Stalowa Wola
- Seat: Bojanów

Area
  - Total: 178.4 km^{2} (68.9 sq mi)

Population (2013)
  - Total: 7,482
  - Density: 41.94/km^{2} (108.6/sq mi)
- Website: http://www.bojanow.pl

Gmina Bojanów is a rural gmina (administrative district) in Stalowa Wola County, Subcarpathian Voivodeship, in south-eastern Poland. Its seat is the village of Bojanów, which lies approximately 22 kilometres (14 mi) south of Stalowa Wola and 41 km (25 mi) north of the regional capital Rzeszów.

The gmina covers an area of 178.6 square kilometres (69.0 sq mi), and as of 2006 its total population is 7,193 (7,482 in 2013).

== Villages ==
Gmina Bojanów contains the villages and settlements of Bojanów, Burdze, Cisów Las, Gwoździec, Korabina, Kozły Załęże, Laski, Maziarnia, Przyszów, Ruda, Stany, and Zakrochowa.

== Neighbouring gminas ==
Gmina Bojanów is bordered by the town of Stalowa Wola and by the gminas of Dzikowiec, Grębów, Jeżowe, Majdan Królewski, Nisko and Nowa Dęba.
