= Gmina Zaklików =

Gmina Zaklików Zaklików Commune
- Gmina
- Coat of arms
- Interactive map of Gmina Zaklików
- Coordinates (Zaklików): 50°46′N 22°7′E
- Country: Poland
- Voivodeship: Subcarpathian
- County: Stalowa Wola
- Seat: Zaklików

Area
  - Total: 202.15 km^{2} (78.05 sq mi)

Population (2013)
  - Total: 8,709
  - Density: 43.08/km^{2} (111.6/sq mi)
- Website: http://www.zaklikow.net/

Gmina Zaklików is a rural gmina (administrative district) in Stalowa Wola County, Subcarpathian Voivodeship, in south-eastern Poland. Its seat is the village of Zaklików, which lies approximately 21 kilometres (13 mi) north of Stalowa Wola and 82 km (51 mi) north of the regional capital Rzeszów.

The gmina covers an area of 202.15 square kilometres (78.1 sq mi), and as of 2006 its total population is 8,550 (8,709 in 2013).

== Villages ==
Gmina Zaklików contains the villages and settlements of Antoniówka, Dąbrowa, Gielnia, Goliszowiec, Irena, Józefów, Karkówka, Kruszyna, Łążek, Lipa, Łysaków, Łysaków-Kolonia, Nowe Baraki, Stare Baraki, Zaklików, Zdziechowice Drugie and Zdziechowice Pierwsze.

== Neighbouring gminas ==
Gmina Zaklików is bordered by the gminas of Gościeradów, Potok Wielki, Pysznica, Radomyśl nad Sanem and Trzydnik Duży.
