= Jastkowice =

- Village
- Location within Poland
- Coordinates: 50°36′14″N 22°6′24″E
- Country: Poland
- Voivodeship: Subcarpathian
- County: Stalowa Wola
- Gmina: Pysznica
- Population: 2,350

Jastkowice [jastkɔˈvit͡sɛ] is a village in the administrative district of Gmina Pysznica, within Stalowa Wola County, Subcarpathian Voivodeship, in south-eastern Poland.

== History ==
The first mention of Jastkowice comes from 1325. The starosta of Sandomierz, Drogosz from Chroberz, granted the village of Jastkowice communal status to Mikołaj of Jastkowice. But the actual date of the location of Jastkowice is in August 1, 1375, when the Queen of Hungary and Poland, Elizabeth, confirmed the privilege of the staroste Drogosz from Chroberz.
