= Chłopska Kępa =

- Settlement
- Location within Poland
- Coordinates: 54°6′19″N 16°10′24″E
- Country: Poland
- Voivodeship: West Pomeranian
- County: Koszalin
- Gmina: Świeszyno
- Population: 56

Chłopska Kępa [ˈxwɔpska ˈkɛmpa] (German: Bauernkamp) is a settlement in the administrative district of Gmina Świeszyno, within Koszalin County, West Pomeranian Voivodeship, in north-western Poland. It lies approximately 2 km (1 mi) south of Świeszyno, 9 km (6 mi) south of Koszalin, and 130 km (81 mi) north-east of the regional capital Szczecin.

For the history of the region, see History of Pomerania.

The settlement has a population of 56.

== See also ==
- Chłopska Wola
