= Irena, Podkarpackie Voivodeship =

Irena
- Village
- Location within Poland
- Coordinates: 50°45′N 22°3′E
- Country: Poland
- Voivodeship: Subcarpathian
- County: Stalowa Wola
- Gmina: Zaklików
- Time zone: UTC+1 (CET)
  - Summer (DST): UTC+2 (CEST)
- Postal code: 37-470
- Vehicle registration: RST

Irena [iˈrɛna] is a village in the administrative district of Gmina Zaklików, within Stalowa Wola County, Subcarpathian Voivodeship, in south-eastern Poland.

== History ==
According to the 1921 census, the village with the adjacent sawmill had a population of 380, 94.7% Polish and 5.3% Jewish.

During the German occupation of Poland in World War II, on 3 October 1942, the German gendarmerie murdered 12 residents and burnt a few buildings.
