= Gmina Radomyśl nad Sanem =

Gmina Radomyśl nad Sanem Radomyśl nad Sanem Commune
- Gmina
- Coat of arms
- Interactive map of Gmina Radomyśl nad Sanem
- Coordinates (Radomyśl nad Sanem): 50°41′N 21°57′E
- Country: Poland
- Voivodeship: Subcarpathian
- County: Stalowa Wola
- Seat: Radomyśl nad Sanem

Area
  - Total: 133.63 km^{2} (51.59 sq mi)

Population (2013)
  - Total: 7,397
  - Density: 55.35/km^{2} (143.4/sq mi)
- Website: http://www.radomysl.pl

Gmina Radomyśl nad Sanem is a rural gmina (administrative district) in Stalowa Wola County, Subcarpathian Voivodeship, in south-eastern Poland. Its seat is the village of Radomyśl nad Sanem, which lies approximately 14 kilometres (9 mi) north-west of Stalowa Wola and 73 km (45 mi) north of the regional capital Rzeszów.

The gmina covers an area of 133.63 square kilometres (51.6 sq mi), and as of 2006 its total population is 7,471 (7,397 in 2013).

== Villages ==
Gmina Radomyśl nad Sanem contains the villages and settlements of Antoniów, Chwałowice, Czekaj Pniowski, Dąbrowa Rzeczycka, Dąbrówka Pniowska, Kępa Rzeczycka, Łążek Chwałowicki, Musików, Nowiny, Orzechów, Ostrówek, Pniów, Radomyśl nad Sanem, Rzeczyca Długa, Rzeczyca Okrągła, Witkowice, Wola Rzeczycka, Żabno and Zalesie.

== Neighbouring gminas ==
Gmina Radomyśl nad Sanem is bordered by the gminas of Annopol, Dwikozy, Gorzyce, Gościeradów, Pysznica, Zaklików, Zaleszany and Zawichost.
