= Gmina Pysznica =

Gmina Pysznica Pysznica Commune
- Gmina
- Flag Coat of arms
- Interactive map of Gmina Pysznica
- Coordinates (Pysznica): 50°34′12″N 22°7′49″E
- Country: Poland
- Voivodeship: Subcarpathian
- County: Stalowa Wola
- Seat: Pysznica

Area
  - Total: 147.82 km^{2} (57.07 sq mi)

Population (2013)
  - Total: 10,480
  - Density: 70.90/km^{2} (183.6/sq mi)
- Website: http://www.pysznica.pl/

Gmina Pysznica is a rural gmina (administrative district) in Stalowa Wola County, Subcarpathian Voivodeship, in south-eastern Poland. Its seat is the village of Pysznica, which lies approximately 6 kilometres (4 mi) east of Stalowa Wola and 61 km (38 mi) north of the regional capital Rzeszów.

The gmina covers an area of 147.82 square kilometres (57.1 sq mi), and as of 2006 its total population is 9,492 (10,480 in 2013). The boss is Łukasz Bajgierowicz.

== Neighbouring gminas ==
Gmina Pysznica is bordered by the town of Stalowa Wola and by the gminas of Janów Lubelski, Jarocin, Modliborzyce, Nisko, Potok Wielki, Radomyśl nad Sanem, Ulanów and Zaklików.

== Villages ==
Gmina Pysznica contains the villages of Bąków, Brandwica, Chłopska Wola, Jastkowice, Kłyżów, Krzaki, Olszowiec, Pysznica, Słomiana, Studzieniec and Sudoły.
