= Bojanów, Podkarpackie Voivodeship =

Bojanów
- Village
- Location within Poland
- Coordinates: 50°24′N 21°57′E
- Country: Poland
- Voivodeship: Subcarpathian
- County: Stalowa Wola
- Gmina: Bojanów
- Population: 1,200

Bojanów [bɔˈjanuf] is a village in Stalowa Wola County, Subcarpathian Voivodeship, in south-eastern Poland. It is the seat of the gmina (administrative district) called Gmina Bojanów.
