= Pysznica =

- Village
- Location within Poland
- Coordinates: 50°34′12″N 22°7′49″E
- Country: Poland
- Voivodeship: Subcarpathian
- County: Stalowa Wola
- Gmina: Pysznica
- Population: 2,800

Pysznica [pɨʂˈnit͡sa] is a village in Stalowa Wola County, Subcarpathian Voivodeship, in south-eastern Poland. It is the seat of the gmina (administrative district) called Gmina Pysznica.

Pysznica is home to the football club Olimpia Pysznica.

The village is the birthplace of Polish mathematician Władysław Ślebodziński (1884–1972).
