= Radomyśl nad Sanem =

- Village
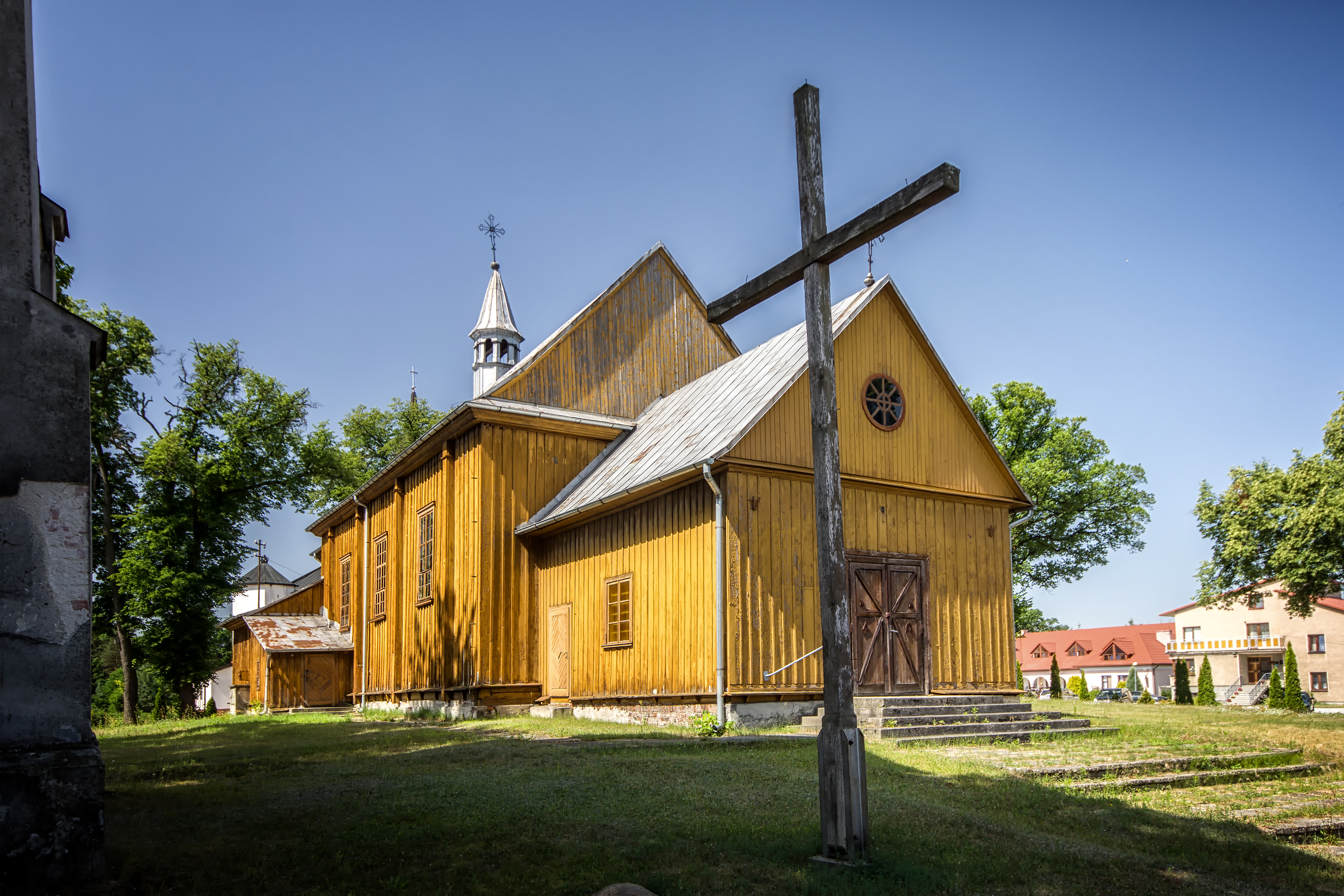
- Church of Saint John the Baptist

- Location within Poland
- Coordinates: 50°41′N 21°57′E
- Country: Poland
- Voivodeship: Subcarpathian
- County: Stalowa Wola
- Gmina: Radomyśl nad Sanem

Population
  - Total: 893

Radomyśl nad Sanem [raˈdɔmɨɕl ˌnat ˈsanɛm] (until 2001 Radomyśl) is a village in Stalowa Wola County, Subcarpathian Voivodeship, in south-eastern Poland. It is the seat of the gmina (administrative district) called Gmina Radomyśl nad Sanem. Radomyśl was a town from 1558 to 1935.

== History ==
In the early days of Polish statehood, the area of Radomyśl belonged to the Duchy of Sandomierz, which later became Sandomierz Voivodeship. In 1474, Lublin Voivodeship was created out of Sandomierz's eastern part, which included the Radomyśl area.

Radomyśl itself was founded as a private village in 1556 by local nobleman Jakub Sienienski. Two years later, King Zygmunt August granted it a town charter (Magdeburg rights), and in 1584, King Stefan Batory gave permission for an annual fair and weekly markets, organized on each Monday.

In the 1772 First Partition of Poland Radomyśl was annexed by the Habsburg monarchy, becoming part of the Galicia and Lodomeria crownland. It remained under Habsburg control (as part of the Austrian Empire from 1804 and Austria-Hungary (Cisleithania) from 1867) until the end of World War I, when it became part of the Lwów Voivodeship of the Second Polish Republic. In 1935 it lost its town charter, after almost 400 years.

During the Nazi occupation of Poland in World War II it was administered as part of the Lublin District of the General Government.
