= Joseph Lewinstein =

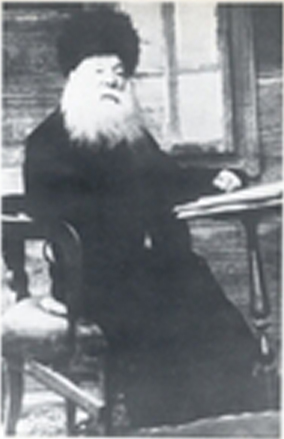
Rabbi Josef Lewinsten

Josef "Josek" Lewinsten (Lewinsztejn) was a Jewish rabbi and religious author born on July 11, 1842, at Lublin under the Russian Partition of Poland. He was a member of the family of rabbis and Talmudists which includes the author of Penei Yehoshua and the Lebushim. Josek was the son of Rabbi Abram Abuś Lewinszteyn and Chana Lewensztein (Himmelfarb).

In 1860, at the age of twenty, he became the rabbi of Karol in the governorate of Plotzk (Płock). In 1868, he became the rabbi of Zaklikov in the governorate of Lublin and then in 1875 he was rabbi of Serock in the governorate of Łomża. He died in 1924 in Serock, Masovian Voivodeship, Poland.

== Works ==
- Birkat Abraham: About the Talmudic tractates of Pesahim, Bezah, and Hagigah.
- Pene Abraham: Commentary on Genesis
- A commentary on the Haggadah of Passover
- Dor Dor we-Dorshaw: A collection of 6,600 names of the greats of Israel of all generations, with the dates of their deaths.
- Biographical articles of special genealogical value. They won him recognition as an authority in this field. These articles were published in Ha-Goren, Ha-Eshkol and to other periodicals.
- Appendixes to Ir Gibborim and Ir Tehillah.
- Letter of Approbation for Mordechai Ashkenazi's Geulat Haaretz a work advocating religious Zionism
