= Stal Gorzyce =

Polish football club

- Full name: Gorzycki Klub Sportowy Stal Gorzyce
- Founded: July 1951; 75 years ago
- Ground: Piłsudski Street Stadium
- Capacity: 1,673
- Chairman: Krzysztof Kułaga
- Manager: vacant
- League: IV liga Subcarpathia
- 2024–25: Regional league Stalowa Wola, 2nd of 15 (promoted via play-offs)
- Website: https://stalgorzyce.pl
Home colours

Gorzycki Klub Sportowy Stal Gorzyce is an association football club based in Gorzyce, Poland. Between 1992 and 2014, the club was known as Tłoki Gorzyce.

== History ==
The club was founded in 1951 as Koło Sportowe Stal Gorzyce and has since operated under various names, incorporating "Tłoki" into its title in 1992. The team spent several seasons in the third division and participated in the second league from 2000 to 2004. During the 2000–01 and 2001–02 seasons, they achieved their best finishes, both ending in 10th place.

Despite the name changes, the fans continued to identify with "Stal," and in 2014, the club returned to its historical name – Gorzycki Klub Sportowy Stal Gorzyce.

Former club logo

== Naming history ==
- July 1951 – KS (Koło Sportowe) Stal Gorzyce
- 6 April 1957 – ZKS (Zakładowy Klub Sportowy) Stal Gorzyce
- 1992 – ZKS Stal-Tłoki Gorzyce
- ? – ZKS Tłoki Gorzyce
- 2007 – Gorzycki Klub Sportowy Tłoki Gorzyce
- 2014 – Gorzycki Klub Sportowy Stal Gorzyce

== Honours ==
- 10th place in the second division - 2001–02

== See also ==
- Football in Poland
