= Stalowa Wola County =

Stalowa Wola County Powiat stalowowolski
- County
- Flag Coat of arms

- Location within the voivodeship
- Coordinates (Stalowa Wola): 50°35′N 22°3′E
- Country: Poland
- Voivodeship: Subcarpathian
- Seat: Stalowa Wola
- Gminas: Total 6 (incl. 1 urban): Stalowa Wola; Gmina Bojanów; Gmina Pysznica; Gmina Radomyśl nad Sanem; Gmina Zaklików; Gmina Zaleszany

Area
  - Total: 832.92 km^{2} (321.59 sq mi)

Population (2019)
  - Total: 103,293
  - Density: 124.01/km^{2} (321.19/sq mi)
  - Urban: 60,799
  - Rural: 42,494
- Car plates: RST
- Website: www.stalowowolski.pl

Stalowa Wola County (Polish: powiat stalowowolski) is a unit of territorial administration and local government (powiat) in Subcarpathian Voivodeship, south-eastern Poland. It came into being on January 1, 1999, as a result of the Polish local government reforms passed in 1998. Its administrative seat and only town is Stalowa Wola, which lies 62 kilometres (39 mi) north of the regional capital Rzeszów.

The county covers an area of 832.92 square kilometres (321.6 sq mi). As of 2019 its total population is 103,293, out of which the population of Stalowa Wola is 60,799, and the rural population is 42,494.

== Neighbouring counties ==
Stalowa Wola County is bordered by Kraśnik County to the north, Janów County to the east, Nisko County to the south-east, Kolbuszowa County to the south, and Tarnobrzeg County and Sandomierz County to the west.

== Administrative divisions ==
The county is subdivided into six gminas (one urban and five rural). These are listed in the following table, in descending order of population.

Gmina	Type	Area (km^{2})	Population (2019)	Seat
Stalowa Wola	urban	83.0	60,799	
Gmina Zaleszany	rural	87.3	10,916	Zaleszany
Gmina Pysznica	rural	147.8	11,126	Pysznica
Gmina Zaklików	urban-rural	202.2	5,560	Zaklików
Gmina Radomyśl nad Sanem	rural	133.6	7,341	Radomyśl nad Sanem
Gmina Bojanów	rural	179.6	7,551	Bojanów
