= The Ugly Black Bird =

1994 book by Joanna Siedlecka

The Ugly Black Bird: The Real Story of Jerzy Kosiński's Wartime Childhood
- Cover of the English edition
- Author: Joanna Siedlecka
- Language: Polish
- Genre: investigative reporting
- Publisher: Wydawnictwo Marabut and Wydawnictwo CiS
- Publication date: 1994
- Publication place: Poland
- English publication date: 2018
- ISBN: 83-85458-04-2

The Ugly Black Bird: The Real Story of Jerzy Kosiński's Wartime Childhood (Note: Joanna Siedlecka apparently chose the book's Polish title, Czarny ptasior ("The Black Bird") as a play on words relating to the title of Jerzy Kosiński's novel The Painted Bird. In Polish, "blackbird" is "kos" – the first three letters of the surname "Kosiński", which can be read: "of or pertaining to a blackbird". "Ptasior" is a variant, of the word "ptak" ("bird"), that carries a deprecatory connotation, which the book's English title, The Ugly Black Bird, seeks to suggest using the word "Ugly". "Ugly", however, is an ambiguous word that can refer either to an "ugly" liar or to a person's "ugly" appearance, and therefore makes the book's English title more inscrutable. A more legible English title could have been, simply, The Blackbird.) is the 2018 English-language version of a 1994 Polish-language book, Czarny ptasior by Joanna Siedlecka, about Jewish-Polish-American writer and Holocaust survivor Jerzy Kosiński. The book is Siedlecka's study of Kosiński's life during World War II, which had often been assumed to have resembled the life of the protagonist in his novel The Painted Bird.

Siedlecka concludes that, unlike the protagonist's life, Kosiński's in occupied Poland was less eventful – that he and his family managed to survive the Holocaust, hiding in the village of Dąbrowa Rzeczycka with the Polish villagers' help. Her analysis discredits the presumed autobiographical elements in The Painted Bird.

Initially some critics of Siedlecka's book viewed it as too unsympathetic to Kosiński. In Poland – according to Kosiński biography written by James Park Sloan – "to side against Siedlecka [was] to affirm one's stance as cosmopolitan, anti-Marxist and anti-anti-semitic". Criticism of Siedlecka's book lessened a few months later, after Sloan published an article in The New Yorker which corroborated most of her findings. Since then her book has drawn mixed reviews – criticism for its author's lack of sympathy for Kosiński, alongside praise for her having unearthed the historical truth and debunked assumptions that The Painted Bird was autobiographical.

== History ==
Joanna Siedlecka's book was inspired by letters that appeared in the Polish press in 1968, 1982, and 1983, citing eyewitness accounts that contradicted Kosiński's narrative.

The 1994 original, Polish-language version was published in Poland by Wydawnictwo Marabut and Wydawnictwo CiS and went through a second edition in 1998 and a third in 2011.

With the support of the Polish Book Institute (Instytut Książki) it was translated into English in 2018 as The Ugly Black Bird, published by Leopolis Press; and into Czech in 2019 as Černé ptáče, published by Volvox Globator.

== Content ==
The title of Siedlecka's book refers to the title of Kosiński's 1965 novel The Painted Bird. His story of a Jewish boy suffering terrible ordeals during the Holocaust was well received internationally and was considered an important document of the Holocaust. The Painted Bird was widely thought to be largely autobiographical, and was so claimed to be by Kosiński himself. Siedlecka's book documents that Kosiński "profoundly falsified his wartime experiences" in the novel, portraying his life during World War II as much more dreadful than it was.

Siedlecka based her book on interviews that she conducted with people in and around Dąbrowa Rzeczycka, a village where Kosiński lived during the war with his family and whose inhabitants, Siedlecka shows, enabled the Kosiński family to survive the war. She controversially writes that Kosiński's father, Moses Lewinkof, pragmatically collaborated with the occupiers. Possibly with the German Gestapo and very probably with the Soviet NKVD. The NKVD likely caused the arrests and exiles of some of the peasants who had helped Kosiński and his family survive the war. James Park Sloan writes that, while Siedlecka devotes part of her book to Kosiński's father, her "real scorn ... is reserved for the son, who turned his back on the family's saviors and vilified them, along with the entire Polish nation, in the eyes of the world."

== Reception ==
=== In Poland ===
Upon its 1994 publication in Poland, the book received many reviews, including critical ones in Gazeta Wyborcza and Polityka, and positive ones in Tygodnik Solidarności and Arka. The book also prompted debate in other Polish media. According to Monika Adamczyk-Garbowska, Polish reviews were "more negative than favourable". Critics of her work included Henryk Dasko, Michał Cichy, Tadeusz Komendant, Wacław Sadkowski, Monika Adamczyk-Grabowska, Adam Boniecki, Marcin Piasecki, Ryszard Marek Groński, Janusz Majcherek, Krzysztof Teodor Toeplitz, Aleksandra Jakubowska, and Maria Janion. Positive reviews at that time came from Piotr Szwajcer, Teresa Bochwic and Edmund Morawiec.

Adamczyk-Garbowska observed that some Polish critics were afraid to criticize Kosiński (or praise Siedlecka) due to fear of being seen as pro-communist; (Note: Kosiński's book was subject to much criticism in Polish communist press decades earlier.) such a sentiment was expressed for example by Anna Bojarska. Piotr Gursztyn argued that criticism of Siedlecka represented elitists' bias for intellectual Kosiński versus their dislike for "backward Polish peasants". American historian James Park Sloan noted that upon publication the book has caused a controversy in Poland, where its initial reception was rather negative among liberal intellectuals, many of whom recalled the inept criticism of The Painted Bird by the communist authorities in the 1960s. Siedlecka's defense of Poland – whom Kosiński was widely seen as having vilified in his account – was simplistic, and according to critics, downplayed Polish antisemitism. He noted that while few disagreed with Siedlecka's core findings; (Note: That Kosiński's work was fiction.) "to side against Siedlecka's is to affirm one's stance as cosmopolitan, anti-Marxist and anti-anti-semitic". Reminiscing about early reception of her work in 2019, Sielecka described it as "extraordinary outpouring of hate" and a "witch hunt", quoted a number of reviews that called her work "disgusting", and noted that she has been criticized for bad-faithed "insinuations" ranging from accusations of antisemitism to being described as a naïve "dumb blonde" who was misled by the local peasants.

Criticism of Siedlecka's work lessened a few months after its release with the publication of a New Yorker article by James Park Sloan, who corroborated most of Siedlecka's findings. A more long-lasting criticism of the book was that it was too critical and unsympathetic towards Kosiński, with critics arguing that Siedlecka primarily presents the point of view of Polish villagers and ignores the psychological hardships a Jewish boy (Note: Here Kosiński) would have faced while trying to survive the Holocaust in occupied Poland. Meanwhile, the book's supporters argued that Siedlecka unearthed historical truth and that Kosiński's book unfairly libels the Polish nation. They stressed that his The Painted Bird hid any reference to the fact that Kosiński's family survived the war with the help of its neighbours – and then it portrayed many of the same identifiable individuals (Polish villagers) as antagonists. Siedlecka's book is therefore seen as vindication of those villagers.

Later positive reviews of her work included Paweł Lisicki, who reviewed the book's second edition in 2011 for Rzeczpospolita, favorably comparing it to works of Jan T. Gross, as well as Piotr Gursztyn.

In 1996 Jadwiga Mizińska wrote about the book for Polish journal Nowa Krytyka. She discussed it as an example of literary negation, noting the image of Kosiński as shown by Siedlecka is a near perfect opposite of the protagonist of The Painted Bird.

=== International ===
James Park Sloan, whose later biography of Kosiński, published in 1996, mostly endorsed Siedlecka's findings, reviewed her book for The New Yorker in 1994, calling it an exposé. Sloan recounted his own investigation, retracing Siedlecka's steps, interviewing witnesses and consulting local archives, and concluded: that "Siedlecka's basic story was confirmed by more than a dozen informants", and that Kosiński's account "is fiction; Kosinski borrowed the atrocities from other accounts, or made them up". He did, however, criticize Siedlecka's account for underestimating the psychological stress and pain that Kosiński's Jewish family must have faced during the wartime.

Monika Adamczyk-Garbowska discussed the book in an article in Polin: Studies in Polish Jewry in 1999. She acknowledged that she had already reviewed the book for Polish press, and that her review was critical and highly emotional. In Polin she noted that Siedlecka's book is likely mostly factually correct, but she nonetheless criticized it as too unsympathetic for Kosiński (writing that "Siedlecka's book does not offer Jerzy Kosinski a single warm word"), and noted that its publication led to a significant debate in Poland, both times the book was published. She also wrote that Siedlecka's book was marketed as presenting Kosiński's "true" story, which she considered unnecessary as The Painted Bird presented a fictionalized account, although she acknowledged that "there is evidence that some critics, including Elie Wiesel, have read it as autobiographical".

In 2022 Elżbieta Rokosz, in her chapter on controversies about Kosiński's book, noted that Siedlecka's work successfully discredited "the autobiographical value of The Painted Bird".

== See also ==
- Category:Holocaust-related hoaxes
