= Jack Henry Abbott =

American murderer and author

- Abbott in handcuffs
- Born: Jack Henry Abbott; January 21, 1944; Oscoda, Michigan, U.S.
- Died: February 10, 2002 (aged 58); Wende Correctional Facility, Alden, New York, U.S.
- Occupation: Author
- Spouse: Naomi Zack (m. 1990; div. 1992)
- Writing career
- Period: 1981–1987
- Subject: Prison life
- Criminal information
- Status: Deceased
- Criminal charge: Manslaughter
- Penalty: 3 to 23 years imprisonment (1967); Life imprisonment (1982)

Details
- Victims: 2

Jack Henry Abbott (January 21, 1944 – February 10, 2002) was an American murderer and author. With a long history of criminal convictions, Abbott's writing concerning his life and experiences was lauded by author Norman Mailer. Due partly to lobbying by Mailer and others on Abbott's behalf, Abbott was released from prison in 1981 where he was serving sentences for forgery, manslaughter, and bank robbery. Abbott's memoir In the Belly of the Beast was published with positive reviews soon after his release.

Six weeks after being paroled from prison, Abbott killed waiter Richard Adan following an argument at a New York City cafe. Abbott was convicted and sent back to prison, where he killed himself in 2002.

Abbott described his life as being a "state-raised convict", having spent just over nine months outside of confinement in state facilities, including solitary confinement, between the ages of 12 and 37. He wrote that because of confinement with other violent offenders from whom he could not escape, he developed a subjective perspective that every encounter was potentially threatening.

== Early life ==
Abbott was born on January 21, 1944, at Camp Skeel in Oscoda, Michigan, to Rufus Henry Abbott and Mattie Jung. Rufus, who was of Irish descent, served in the Army Air Corps and was described as an alcoholic. Mattie, who was of mixed Chinese and European descent, made a living as a prostitute around military bases and had four other children that she gave up for adoption. The couple married after Abbott's birth, but Rufus abandoned the family shortly after the end of World War II, divorcing Mattie in 1948. Both sides of Abbott's family rejected Abbott and his older sister Frances for being mixed race. Abbott himself identified as White and referred to his mother as "Eurasian".

Abbott and his sister were raised by their mother in her hometown of Salt Lake City until 1950, when both were taken into foster care. For five years, the siblings lived with the family of Albert Barlow, a Mormon man with five wives and 54 children. Abbott became fond of his foster family, referring to Barlow as "Uncle Albert" and being baptized by the Church of Jesus Christ of Latter-day Saints. During the same time, Abbott still received regular visits by his biological mother. At age nine, Abbott was first tried by a juvenile court for vandalism and later dropped out of school in the sixth grade.

In 1955, the Abbott siblings were taken out of Barlow's home when the latter was imprisoned for bigamy. Abbott subsequently ran away from any other assigned foster family before being sent to Utah State Industrial School, a reform school in Ogden, Utah, following an attempted car theft. Barring a sixty-day parole, Abbott remained inside the grounds of the facility between the ages of 12 and 18. According to Abbott, his mistreatment by the school guards left him maladjusted for life. The year of his release, Abbott had also learned that his mother died by suicide, with state authorities refusing to let Abbott attend her funeral.

When Abbott reunited with his sister Frances, he learned that she had married a former neighborhood friend, Ben Amador, the same year he was confined to the reform school. Abbott rejected Amador, believing him to be of Mexican origin, and, by his own account, also struggled with "incestuous urges". Although the relationship between Abbott and Amador mellowed over the years, Abbott ordered Amador to never physically touch Frances in his presence. Abbott reportedly only accepted Amador upon learning that he was of recent Spanish descent, still expressing hostility towards Latinos in later prison writings.

== First incarceration ==
In January 1963, at age 18, Abbott was sentenced to a maximum sentence of five years at Utah State Prison for forgery, after falsifying $20,000 worth of checks he had stolen during a shoe store burglary. On January 10, 1966, Abbott stabbed two fellow inmates, fatally wounding James L. Christensen, who died at the prison infirmary ten days after the attack. Prison officer Lester Clayton testified that Abbott had snuck up on the men from behind, specifically targeting Christensen. Abbott later claimed that Christensen had previously made sexual advances on him, which Abbott alleged was planned by "enemies" from his former reform school, and that he acted in self-defence, believing Christensen was planning to rape him. The other inmate, Olsen, was seriously injured in the neck. Guards apprehended Abbott at the scene and beat him severely before locking Abbott in solitary confinement for nearly a month. On April 17, 1967, he was given a sentence of three to twenty years for assault with a deadly weapon. In later correspondences with Mailer, Abbott framed the killing as the result of a prison fight by claiming that both of the other inmates were armed with "a club of some sort", while during his conviction, Abbott claimed he attacked Christensen because he had told staff about contraband in his cell. He spent a significant portion of his incarceration in solitary confinement for repeated disciplinary infractions, which he estimated amounted to over five years. Between 1966 and 1971, he had thirty incident and disciplinary reports at Utah State Prison, including for two assaults on correctional officers. Whenever not in solitary confinement, where the only reading material in Utah was the Bible or the Book of Mormon, Abbott extensively read books provided through a prisoners' program by PEN America.

In March 1971, Abbott escaped prison with another inmate and remained a fugitive for six weeks, but was returned when he was arrested after robbing a bank in Denver on April 27 of the same year. His sentence was increased by 19 years as a result. Abbott later claimed to have spent part of his escape in Montreal and described the brief period as the first time he felt free since his teenage years. Following the bank robbery conviction, Abbott entered into the federal prison system. He spent the first few years at Federal Correctional Institution, Leavenworth, McNeil Island Corrections Center, and United States Medical Center for Federal Prisoners, Springfield.

In 1973, Abbott wrote a letter to writer Jerzy Kosiński, at the time president of PEN America and a strong proponent of prison reform, after reading Kosiński's 1965 novel The Painted Bird. Abbott, who had become a Marxist-Leninist by this point, mistakenly thought that Kosiński, a staunch anti-communist, shared his beliefs due to a positive portrayal of the Red Army in his novel. In 1975, Abbott accused Kosiński of plagiarising some of his ideas from their letters in his latest novel Cockpit. Kosiński described Abbott's reaction as "the most sustained, vile barrage of personal, sexual, political, and aesthetic abuse, dissecting my novels and filtering them through his notion of my betrayal of mankind". Coupled with Abbott's previous positive comments on Stalinism, Kosiński ceased contact, even as Abbott wrote him apologies.

In summer 1978, Abbott was held at Federal Detention Center, Houston, after being suspected but ultimately cleared of taking part in the attempted murder of a prison guard at Federal Correctional Institution, Atlanta, pending return to Federal Correctional Institution, Lompoc II. In July 1979, following a hunger strike, he was transferred to Federal Correctional Institution, Marion, where he became an informant after being promised a parole date. Before returning to Utah State Prison in June 1980, Abbott exposed a drug smuggling operation by attorneys of the Marion Prisoners’ Rights Project and in December 1980, he gave the identities of the organizing inmates in the 1980-1981 work stoppage strikes at Marion. When confronted with this information during his sentence for manslaughter by Mailer, Abbott claimed that correctional staff had put him in solitary confinement for two months during that timeframe and been forced to confess to crimes he was involved at Marion to secure his parole. He ultimately did not receive parole through this measure and by age 34, Abbott had been temporarily relocated to Federal Correctional Complex, Butner in North Carolina.

=== Correspondence with Norman Mailer ===
In 1977, Abbott read that author Norman Mailer was writing about convicted killer Gary Gilmore. Abbott wrote to Mailer, alleging that Gilmore was largely embellishing his experiences, and offered to write about his time in prison in order to provide a more factual depiction of life in prison. Mailer agreed and helped to publish In the Belly of the Beast, a book concerning life in the prison system consisting of Abbott's letters to Mailer.

Their correspondence continued over several prison transfers in 1978, including FCI Maion, FCI Lompoc, and Federal Correctional Institution, La Tuna.

On October 29 or November 3, 1979, Mailer visited Abbott at FCI Marion, after several previous attempts at visitation failed as Mailer was denied for being of no relation to Abbott. Brothers Peter and J. Michael Lennon drove Mailer over and after the visit, Mailer told the Lennons that he thought "Jack deserved a chance at freedom". Mailer was unable to give Abbott his latest book The Executioner's Song, based on his interactions with Gilmore, but a copy was delivered through prison mail, though first withheld until Abbott staged a hunger strike. Abbott read the 1,056-page book in eight days and reviewed it positively in several notes sent to Mailer. While Abbott called the book Mailer's greatest work yet, he disliked that Gilmore was the only one criticized, and that he had failed to account for Gilmore's intergenerational trauma.

== Release ==
Mailer endorsed Abbott's attempts to gain parole, with plans to support Abbott by providing him with a position as a research assistant. Abbott was released to parole on June 5, 1981, despite the misgivings of prison officials, one of whom questioned Abbott's mental state and whether he was rehabilitated, saying, "I thought ... that Mr. Abbott was a dangerous individual ... I didn't see a changed man. His attitude, his demeanor indicated psychosis."

Abbott was placed in a Salvation Army halfway house in the Bowery, at the time known as "one of the highest-crime precincts in the city", after a different facility in the Upper West Side rejected Abbott for his "violent records". Abbott was supposed to stay at the residence until August 1981, when he would switch to federal parole. Describing his time in the Bowery, Abbott described the neighborhood as a "human zoo" and said that he began carrying a knife on him after his pair of new shoes were stolen at the halfway house.

Shortly after arriving in New York City, Abbott met Mailer, his wife Norris Church and their three-year-old son John Buffalo at his Brooklyn home. Abbott frequently visited thereafter for dinner and on July 9, he received permission to travel to Mailer's Cape Cod summer home in Provincetown, Massachusetts, via bus. During one Brooklyn visit, Abbott met several of Mailer's personal friends, including socialite Patricia Kennedy Lawford, novelist Jean Malaquais and dramatist Dotson Rader. According to Lawford, Abbott spent the night criticising the United States as a "fascist hell-hole" and when mentioning his intention to move to Cuba, Lawford promptly "offered to buy him a one-way ticket" in annoyance. Mailer later noted that he felt "[more] like a babysitter [than a] literary mentor" when talking with Abbott in person, noting that he had a tendency to not finish sentences or give vague responses, in contrast to his "clear" writing style. Mailer's family recalled Abbott to be "socially unskilled, but very respectful", though commenting on his habit of openly talking about his prison life, including the killing of James Christensen.

Abbott made regular visits to Penguin Random House to meet with senior editor Erroll McDonald, who took notice of Abbott's short temper and lack of societal awareness, recalling a visit to Macy's Herald Square, where Abbott was surprised that he could try on pants before purchase and mistook collapsible umbrellas on sale for clubs. McDonald often took Abbott to parties, where he would typically stand in a corner at the door without speaking to anyone, refusing to leave his back exposed. McDonald and his colleague Gary Fisketjon later described Abbott as "a man in a different universe" and "a fish out of water". Abbott later stated that he was unused to the disrespectful attitude he observed in New York's streets, as "in prison such rudeness was inevitably followed by physical violence".

During a small celebration at Il Mulino restaurant in Greenwich Village, Abbott encountered Jerzy Kosiński. Despite Kosiński ending their prison correspondence with assurances that he would stay away from Abbott for fear of being killed, Kosiński sought to stay in Abbott's company on later occasions. After Abbott's manslaughter conviction, Kosiński reasoned that he had "[t]he desire to believe that talent does in fact redeem, the impulse to romanticize Mr. Abbott's life and the need to partake in one of the literary community's rituals", saying that he only gave Abbott a chance as his political views had at least not been "Hitlerian-Mussolinian".

The media presence around Abbott had built up towards his release and while in New York, he continued to be the subject of great public interest. Abbott held interviews with People, Rolling Stone and the SoHo Weekly News, was photographed by Jill Krementz and appeared together with Mailer on Good Morning America. There had also been rumors about a potential movie about Abbott with Robert De Niro or Christopher Walken in the starring role. The New York Times had published Anatole Broyard's favorable review of In the Belly of the Beast.

In July 1981, Abbott separately met Véronique de St. André and Susan Roxas, who were French and Filipino respectively. Abbott stated that he felt disarmed around them as, unlike when he was with men, he did "not have to put up with the phony tough-guy shit". Abbott told Mailer that both women had a positive influence on him and that he genuinely enjoyed conversation with de St. André and Roxas.

== Manslaughter ==
At about 5 a.m. on July 18, 1981, six weeks after being paroled from prison, Abbott, accompanied by de St. André and Roxas, went to a small cafe named the Binibon, located at 79 Second Avenue in the Bowery, after the trio had spent the evening before at a beer garden. The Binibon night manager was 22-year-old Richard Adan, the owner's son-in-law, who had a minor acting career in Spain's public television and recently written a play for La MaMa Experimental Theatre Club. Adan had called his wife before servicing Abbott's group, describing them as the last customers for his shift. According to de St. André and Roxas, they had been ordering off the menu with a waiter when Abbott asked Adan to use the bathroom. Adan explained that the bathroom could be accessed only through the kitchen, and because the restaurant did not have accident insurance for customers, only employees could use the bathroom. Abbott argued with him. Adan led him outside to a dumpster, on 5th St, outside the restaurant, to urinate.

According to a witness from a nearby apartment, Abbott and Adan continued to argue, after which Adan, apparently frightened, began walking out of the alley towards the restaurant entrance. Abbott ran after Adan, pulled out his knife, and wrapped one arm around Adan's neck before repeatedly stabbing him in the chest "with terrific velocity". Abbott insulted Adan as he was on the ground, with the witness hearing Adan mutter "God, no. Are you crazy?" and "You didn’t have to kill me" before he collapsed on the sidewalk. Abbott ran back into the restaurant and ushered his female companions out with the words "I just killed a man". Only hours later, In the Belly of the Beast was officially released for public sale. On 19 July, The New York Times, not yet informed of Abbott's latest crime, published a "glowing review" of the memoir by Terrence Des Pres, positive of Abbott's writing style and self-reflection, and noting the persistent theme of anger, writing "His prose is most penetrating, most knife-like, when anger is its occasion.".

=== Escape and arrest ===
Fleeing the scene, Abbott returned to his room at the halfway house, taking $200 he had hidden there before ordering a taxi for Port Authority Bus Terminal. Upon his arrival there, however, Abbott took another cab to a Citibank at Lexington/54th Street to access his account with $1,000 from an advance fee by his publisher, unaware that banks were closed on Saturdays. To avoid arousing suspicion too early, Abbott went to a planned brunch at the apartment of Jean Malaquais and his wife, who later stated that Abbott talked about literature as usual, but inquired about routes through which to leave New York City. At Malaquais' suggestion, Abbott took a bus from Staten Island to New Jersey, which brought him back to Port Authority, where he took a bus to Philadelphia.

Abbott crossed the border and arrived in Mexico City on July 22. He looked for shelter across Puebla before meeting an American beggar named Griffin in Mexico City, with whom he shared a motel room for several days before travelling to Veracruz, after Abbott planned to acquire a British passport to flee to Cuba. Griffin discovered Abbott's fugitive status in an older New York Times issue, but did not confront Abbott, who was armed with a revolver. After parting ways, Abbott returned to the United States and spent time in New Orleans, where he befriended two sex workers, who later told police that Abbott appeared "sad and lonely", paying one of them for a simple hug. Abbott left after one of the women promised and failed to smuggle him out of the country via ship. By this point, NYPD Detective William Majeski contacted several of Abbott's family members and former prison friends, who confirmed that he was keeping in contact with them and tried to lure Abbott into several traps with promises of money through third-parties. Abbott was arrested on September 23, 1981, while working on an oil field outside of Morgan City, Louisiana. Abbott had arranged to accompany a colleague to an offshore rig a few days earlier. During Abbott's arrest, several illegal laborers fled the scene believing there was an immigration raid. Other workers stuck around to hear Abbott's charges, with one man heckling police by shouting "Who cares if one New Yorker kills another!?".

== Trial and return to prison ==
During his trial in January 1982, Abbott was initially charged with second-degree murder. He was represented by a well-known defense attorney, Ivan Fisher. Besides Mailer and his literary colleagues, the trial was attended by numerous high-profile celebrities, including Susan Sarandon and Christopher Walken, who had considered playing Abbott in an autobiographic movie, some of whom, like Jerzy Kosiński, continued to endorse him. He was convicted of manslaughter but acquitted of murder, and sentenced to 15 years to life.

While Abbott was held in custody for Adan's killing, reviews for In the Belly of the Beast became markedly more negative, with a focus on the way Abbott blamed most of his issues on the penal system rather than his own criminal acts. Felice Picano wrote in the New York Native that while most criticisms of Abbott's experiences in prison were valid, Abbott presented a "hypocritical and condescending view" on homosexuality in a prison environment. Abbott admitted to situational homosexuality, but alleged that this behavior was "almost always connected with aggression and humiliation" rather than sexual preference, with Picano's article outlining that Abbott's claims were contrary to those he had gathered from other ex-convicts. In previous letters to Mailer, Abbott wrote that "everybody is bisexual before 'maturity', a stage the state-raised convict is not allowed to reach". Author Jerome Loving also noted that despite Abbott's insistence that he was heterosexual outside of prison, Abbott was known to frequent a discotheque commonly patronized by "prostitutes and transsexuals", with police recording him in the company of a "Puerto Rican she/he" during one visit.

Mailer was criticized for his role in getting Abbott released and was accused of being so impressed by Abbott's evident writing talent that he did not consider his violent nature. In a 1992 interview in The Buffalo News, Mailer said that his involvement with Abbott was "another episode in my life in which I can find nothing to cheer about or nothing to take pride in". Kosinski admitted that their advocacy of Abbott was, in essence, "a fraud."

== Second incarceration ==
During custody, Abbott was held in Metropolitan Detention Center. He spent most of his manslaughter sentence at at FCI Marion. In the mid-1980s, Abbott met his later wife Naomi Zack, at the time a professor at the State University of New York, while she was researching the killing of Richard Adan as part of a film project centered around the victims of crime and the U.S. criminal justice system. Through their meetings, Zack became an advocate for Abbott, arguing that his trial was marred by the intense and sensationalist media presence surrounding the case. With assistance from Zack, Abbott wrote his second book, My Return (1987), which was not as popular as In the Belly of the Beast. He spends part of the book reviewing his correspondence with Mailer, the killing of Richard Adan, and his second time as a fugitive, as well as his religious life, including his conversion to Judaism inspired by his interactions with Mailer, a secular Jew, with a focus on exegesis of the Torah. Abbott and Mailer continued exchanging letters while the former was in jail and in his early years in prison before contact ceased permanently.

Apart from the advance fee of $12,500, Abbott did not receive any revenue from In the Belly of the Beast. In 1983, Adan's widow, Ricci, sued Abbott for a wrongful death claim at the New York Supreme Court, seeking $5 million for Richard Adan's death and $5 million for pain and suffering endured by him. At the time Abbott's assets amounted to $15,000 in escrow from a potential movie adaptation of In the Belly of the Beast, based on an off-Broadway play, though the New York County Sheriff's Office also seized $100,000 accumulated through book sales.

In 1990, Ricci Adan was awarded $7.5 million in damages, which meant she would receive part of the money from In the Belly of the Beast sales. During the proceedings, Abbott represented himself and was thus allowed to cross-examine Ricci Adan in regards to the details of Richard Adan's killing. In 2015, Ricci Adan, who continued her career as an international performing artist, stated that most of the settlement was spent on her lawyer.

In 1999, Abbott filed a lawsuit against the administrator of Attica Correctional Facility, claiming prison guards had intentionally cut off his electricity, but the case was dismissed for lack of evidence. In 2000, Abbott sued the state of New York, accusing Attica prison staff of organizing a severe beating in response to the earlier harassment lawsuit, leaving him with fractures to the face. He was subsequently transferred to a lower security prison.

In June 2001, Abbott appeared before the parole board. His application was denied because of his failure to express remorse, his lengthy criminal record, and his disciplinary problems in prison.

== Death ==
On February 10, 2002, Jack Abbott hanged himself in his prison cell using a makeshift noose made from his bedsheets and shoelaces. He left a suicide note, the contents of which have not been made public. Abbott was not noted for mental health issues and Michael Kuzma, Abbott's lawyer, stated that his client had voiced fears for his life in the weeks before his death. Kuzma ordered an independent autopsy through pathologist Cyril Wecht, who also concluded that the manner of death was suicide.

== Views ==
Abbott claimed that his incarceration from the ages of 12 to 18 was the result of "not adjusting well to foster homes", and his indeterminate sentence of up to five years for "issuing a check for insufficient funds" when he was 18 was another example of a system that criminalizes and harshly punishes those it deems unfit for society.

In both his books, Abbott argues that society must reckon with its treatment of prisoners and that the prison system is fundamentally flawed, in that it treats prisoners like sub-human creatures. In In the Belly of the Beast he describes the helplessness that he says prisoners feel while at the mercy of a prison system that is seemingly never held accountable for its actions. He also hints at the subtle yet devastating effect prisons have on the whole of society. Abbott says:

We have no legal rights as prisoners, only as citizens. The only 'rights' we have are those left to their 'discretion'. So we assert our rights the only way we can. It is a compromise, and in the end, I greatly fear we as prisoners will lose—- but the loss will be society's loss. We are only a few steps removed from society. After us, come you.

Psychologist Robert D. Hare described Abbott as displaying the lack of conscience and empathy typical of psychopaths. When asked in a segment for the television news series A Current Affair if he felt remorse for stabbing Adan, Abbott replied: "Remorse implies you did something wrong... If I'm the one who stabbed him, it was an accident." Abbott also repeatedly insulted Adan's wife in court, claimed his victim had "no future as an actor" and, despite his claims that he was "railroaded," he also asserted that "There was no pain, it was a clean wound".

== In popular culture ==
- In 1983, the Trinity Rep Theatre in Providence, Rhode Island, produced an adaptation of In the Belly of the Beast. It was directed by Adrian Hall and featured Richard Jenkins as Abbott.
- Nick Cave and the Bad Seeds' song "Jack's Shadow" from the album Your Funeral... My Trial (1986) was inspired by Abbott.
- The Australian film Ghosts... of the Civil Dead (1988) was inspired by Abbott's life.
- Portions of In the Belly of the Beast were used in the movie Shambondama Elegy (1999), also known as Tokyo Elegy, by Ian Kerkhof.
- In 2004, a New York theater company produced In the Belly of the Beast Revisited, a play based on Abbott's first book.
- In 2009, the play Binibon by Elliott Sharp and Jack Womack was presented in New York at The Kitchen, based on the 1981 killing of Richard Adan at the Binibon cafe.
- The Law & Order season 13 episode "Genius" is based on Abbott's case.
- In Psycho II, the character of Mary Samuels (Meg Tilly) can be seen reading In the Belly of the Beast. The book is later seen abandoned in the dust outside the Bates Motel.
- In the 1987 movie Stakeout, the character of Richard Montgomery (Aidan Quinn) has the book In the Belly of the Beast in his prison cell.

== See also ==
- Jack Unterweger, an Austrian murderer who became a celebrated author of an autobiography discussing prison life while in prison and was then released and became a serial killer; killed himself by hanging hours after his conviction for nine counts of murder
- Stephen Wayne Anderson, robber and prison escapee who became a poet in prison after being sentenced to death for murder; executed after appeals to have his sentence reduced to life imprisonment were denied
- Jean Genet, ex-convict and novelist, whose works address prison life (among other topics)
- Seth Morgan, ex-convict and novelist, whose book addresses prison life and San Francisco's criminal counterculture
- Sheldon Johnson, a convicted murderer whose story of rehabilitation was featured on The Joe Rogan Experience, and who was shortly thereafter charged with murder of Collin Small.
