= Jerzy Kosinski: A Biography =

1996 biography of Jerzy Kosinski by James Park Sloan

- Cover
- Author: James Park Sloan
- Language: English
- Genres: biography
- Published: 1996
- Publisher: Dutton
- Publication place: United States

Jerzy Kosinski: A Biography is a 1996 biography of the Polish-American and Jewish writer Jerzy Kosiński by American scholar James Park Sloan, published by Dutton.

The book received mixed reviews from several prominent sources. Christopher Lehmann-Haupt of The New York Times praised it as "fascinating" but criticized the author's defense of Kosinski's weaker works, while Louis Begley in the same venue found it chaotic and lacking in meaningful analysis. Other reviewers, including Julia Bloch Frey, appreciated the meticulous research but noted biases due to Sloan's personal connection with Kosinski, while D. G. Myers criticized the book for underestimating Kosinski's anti-communist views and focusing excessively on his personal life.

== Background and content ==
The book is a biography of the Polish-American and Jewish writer Jerzy Kosiński, a Polish-American writer and a Holocaust survivor. The author, James Park Sloan, had been professional acquaintances with Kosinski for about twenty years. Kosiński wrote several popular novels, such as Being There (1971) and the controversial The Painted Bird (1965), and committed suicide in 1991.

== Reception ==
The book received several reviews in press. It was reviewed twice for The New York Times, first by Christopher Lehmann-Haupt and later, by Louis Begley. Lehmann-Haupt called the biography "fascinating" and "extremely worthwhile", stressing that it shows how life, from his very childhood, taught Kosinski the value of "inauthenticity" which later became a guiding philosophy of his life; he did however criticized Sloan for being "left-handed in his defense" of some of Kosinski's weaker works. Begley was less fond of the book, calling it "chaotic", perhaps "written in unusual haste" (Kosinski died in 1991). He wrote that Sloan carries out only a "perfunctory" review of Kosinski literary works, and instead "revels in unappetizing disclosures about Kosinski's life... and, ultimately, he doesn't make much sense of his subject".

Julia Bloch Frey reviewed it for the Los Angeles Times. She notes that Sloan convincingly shows how Holocaust experiences damaged Kosinski's psyche, turning him into a "pathological liar", and that Sloan compares Kosinski to Balzac, whom he calls another "congenial, incorrigible liar." She praises the author for "meticulous research" and notes that the book is relatively balanced and neutral, not an easy task considering its controversial subject. Nonetheless she also concludes that given that Sloan and Kosinski were acquaintances, "Sloan’s studiously neutral position ends up sounding like an apologia for Kosinski" and at times reads "like a justification of the misdeeds of a brilliantly flawed friend".

The book was also reviewed by an anonymous reviewer for the Chicago Tribune. The reviewer observed that "Sloan seems to see Kosinski with greater clarity than many of his rabid detractors or passionate defenders".

D. G. Myers reviewed the book for First Things. The reviewer stresses how Kosinski disliked conformity and therefore, communism that his father swore an allegiance to, developing anti-communist views. Myers argues that Sloan underestimates Kosinski's anti-communist views, arguing that Sloan is a left-leaning liberal and thus unable to understand much of Kosinski who was more of a right-leaning one; therefore Myers criticizes Sloan for being "helpless in dealing with [political] ideas" and unable to properly understand Kosinski's ideology. He also criticizes the book for "troubling features" such as focus on Kosinski's sexuality.

The book was also reviewed in academic journals. Thomas S. Gladsky writing for The Polish Review noted that the subject is difficult to write due to its controversial nature, but commended Sloan for "doing much to assuage all those who have a stake" in the matter. He also notes that the work focuses on the more challenging issue of Kosinski's life rather than his works, which can make some readers interested in literary criticism disappointed. He also noted that some bibliographical notes, while in general, extensive, can be seen as selective and with surprising attribution. He praises the book for "emphasis in the cultural context" (Kosinski's Polish-Jewish heritage), which he argues was until now mostly missing from "Kosinski scholarship". Regarding controversies surrounding authorship, Sloan, according to Gladsky, sholas that while there "may have been ethical misjudgments on Kosinski part... no convincing evidence has surfaced to suggest that the works are anything but Kosinski's". In conclusion, Gladsky writes readers can learn much about Kosinski from this work, and that Sloan shows Kosinski's reputation and art to be genuine and memorable if not accomplished or monumental.

David T. Pfenninger reviewed the book for the Journal of Constructivist Psychology. Noting that "Sloan admires his subject", he praised the work arguing that the it is a "wonderful biography", a "rich psychological study" and that the author "has written a remarkably researched and nuanced book that strangely flows like a novel, with an added dimension of scholarly analysis woven seamlessly into the text". A psychologist, Pfenninger comments also on a number of related topics, such as Kosinski's sexuality, including his plausible Oedipus complex of Kosinski.

== See also ==
- The Ugly Black Bird, the first biographical work about Kosinski, published in 1994 and mostly covering his life during World War II
