= George Reavey =

Russian-born Irish poet (1907 – 1976)

- Born: 1 May 1907 Vitebsk, Russian Empire
- Died: 11 August 1976 (aged 69) New York City, New York, US
- Occupation: Poet; literary agent; publisher; translator
- Spouse: Gwynedd Vernon (m. 1937; div. 1950) I. Rice Pereira (m. 1949; div. 1959) Jean Bullowa (m. 1960)

George Reavey (1 May 1907 – 11 August 1976) was an Irish-Russian surrealist poet, literary agent, publisher, and translator. In addition to his own poetry, Reavey's translations and critical prose helped introduce 20th century Russian poetry to an English-speaking audience. He was also the first publisher to bring out a collection of English translations of the French surrealist poet Paul Éluard.

Perhaps one of the most controversial aspects of Reavey's literary career was his claim, made to the New York press and to British editor and publisher Alan Clodd, that he had written The Painted Bird for Jerzy Kosiński.

== Early life and work ==
Reavey was born on 1 May 1907 in Vitebsk, Russian Empire (present-day Belarus) to Daniel Reavey (1876–1938) and Sophia Reavey (née Turchenko; 1883–1957). Reavey's mother, born in Kyiv, was Russian and his father a managing director of a linen mill in Vitebsk, was born in Belfast.

The family moved to Nizhni Novgorod in 1909, where the young poet was educated and became a fluent Russian speaker. When Daniel was arrested in 1919, during the Russian Civil War, mother and son fled to Belfast.

Reavey attended the Royal Belfast Academical Institution until 1921, at which point the family moved to Fulham, London. Here he attended the Sloan School. He spent the summer holidays in Belfast, where he recorded folk ballads and Gaelic poetry in a series of notebooks. In 1926, he entered Gonville and Caius College, Cambridge, where he studied history and literature. Then he became associated with the group of Cambridge writers associated with the magazine Experiment, including William Empson, Jacob Bronowski, Charles Madge, Kathleen Raine and Julian Trevelyan. He contributed prose and poetry to Experiment along with translations from Boris Pasternak.

== The Paris years ==
In 1929, Reavey moved to Paris with his friend Trevelyan. Ostensibly, this was so that he could improve his French for the entry examinations for the Indian Civil Service, but in fact he was in search of an entry into the avant garde artistic circles based in that city. He met Thomas MacGreevy, who introduced him to Samuel Beckett, James Joyce, Brian Coffey and Denis Devlin and to many of the writers who published in transition. He also became a regular contributor to Samuel Putnam's The New Review. Putnam published Reavey's first book, Faust's Metamorphoses in 1932, a series of twenty vers libre monologues based on Christopher Marlowe's Faust with illustrations by S. W. Hayter who worked with Trevelyan at Atelier 17.

Around this time, Reavey started his literary agency the Bureau Littéraire Européen (later the European Literary Bureau) and his Europa Press imprint. The first three books from the press were Reavey's own Nostradam (1932) and Signes d'Adieu, and Beckett's Echo's Bones and Other Precipitates (both 1935).

== London and the Second World War ==
Just after publishing Echo's Bones, Reavey moved this agency and press to London. This move can be placed in a context of a general surrealist exodus from the French capital. Between 1934 and 1936, Trevelyan, David Gascoyne, Herbert Read, Roland Penrose and E. L. T. Mesens made similar moves. As a result, London became a hub of surrealist-related exhibitions and publishing. Reavey found himself extremely active in this scene, collecting paintings, contributing to Read's Surrealism (1936) and representing authors via the Bureau. His most notable client was Beckett, whose novel Murphy Reavey (unsuccessfully) attempted to place with a publisher.

To coincide with the opening of the International Surrealist Exhibition in 1936, Europa Press published Thorns of Thunder, the first collection of English translations of poems by Paul Éluard to appear. The book featured a drawing by Pablo Picasso and a preface by Read, and the translators included Reavey, Beckett, Devlin, Gascoyne, Man Ray and Ruthven Todd.The press produced four more books, one each by Devlin, Coffey and Charles Henri Ford and Reavey's Quixotic Perquisitions (1939).

With the outbreak of World War II, Reavey first went to the Soviet occupied zone of Poland to rescue his mother. He then closed down the press and bureau and joined the Foreign Office, serving in Madrid and the Soviet Union. Returning to London in 1945, he published Soviet Literature Today (1946) and on the back of this book he was able to move to New York to teach Russian literature.

== Later life and work ==
Apart from occasional trips to Paris, London, Dublin and Belfast, Reavey lived out his life in the United States, where he published a number of important translations, including Alexander Esenin-Volpin's A Leaf of Spring (1961), Fyodor Abramov's New Life: A Day on a Collective Farm (1963), the bilingual anthology The New Russian Poets 1953 – 1968 (1968) and contributions to Yevgeny Yevtushenko's Stolen Apples (1972).

As a poet, Reavey fell more or less out of the public eye after moving to the States. However, he continued to publish collections including Colours of Memory (1955) and Seven Seas (1971). This latter was issued by Coffey from his Advent Press imprint. A group of seven Reavey poems were printed in the 1971 1930s special issue of The Lace Curtain and he was represented in John Montague's Faber Book of Irish Verse (1974).

== Personal life ==
In 1937, Reavey married Gwynedd Vernon, an artist and painter. The couple divorced in 1950.

In August 1949, Reavey meet the artist, poet and philosopher I. Rice Pereira. On 9 September 1950 Perieira and Reavey married in London. Pereira left Reavey on 13 December 1955 and the couple divorced on 19 July 1959.

In 1960, Reavy married the playwright and librettist Jean Bullowa (1917–1987).
