= In the Belly of the Beast =

1981 book by Jack Henry Abbott

- Cover of the paperback edition
- Author: Jack Henry Abbott
- Language: English
- Subject: Prison life
- Publication date: 1981
- Publication place: United States
- ISBN: 978-0-679-73237-2
- OCLC: 23020567
- Dewey Decimal: 365/.44/092 B 20
- LC Class: HV9468.A22 A37 1991
- Followed by: My Return

In the Belly of the Beast is a book written by Jack Henry Abbott and published in 1981.

Jack Henry Abbott was an American prisoner and the book consists of his letters to Norman Mailer about his experiences in what Abbott saw as a brutal and unjust prison system. Mailer supported Abbott's successful bid for parole in 1981, the year that In the Belly of the Beast was published.

The book was very successful, and on July 19, 1981, The New York Times published a mixed to positive review. However, the day before, Abbott had killed waiter Richard Adan during a dispute at a restaurant called Binibon on 2nd Avenue in the East Village of New York City. Abbott was eventually arrested, convicted of manslaughter, and returned to prison for the rest of his life until his suicide in 2002.

Adan's widow sued Abbott, winning the multi-million dollar royalty payments for Belly; Abbott received only a $12,500 publishing advance.

== Adaptations ==
In 1983–1985, William Petersen starred in several stage performances based on the book, for which he received a Joseph Jefferson Award for Best Actor.

In 2004, the New York City theatre company 29th Street Rep ran a play based on the book, named In the Belly of the Beast Revisited.

== Analysis ==
The book has no organizing principle of chronology, nor is it constructed along conventional tale-telling lines. Instead, it has an Introduction by Mailer, a Foreword, and twelve chapters. Each chapter bears a title that labels the chapter's content; the text consists of excerpts on the subject, extracted from Abbott's letters to Mailer. The chapters do not cleave cleanly into discrete matter; there is a lot of overlap in subject matter. Erroll McDonald, a Random House editor, was the organizer.

Critic Anatole Broyard, who reviewed the book in 1981, declared that the best segments of the book were Abbott's letters to Norman Mailer, demonstrating eloquence and an evident, if raw, talent for writing. However, Broyard also wrote that Abbott was less persuading when the topic turned to "rants about justice, politics and philosophy".

Psychologist Robert D. Hare has suggested that Abbott was a probable psychopath, given his history of callousness, manipulative behavior, and lack of conscience; Hare's Without Conscience (1993) quotes Abbott in displaying these traits.

== In other media ==
The Australian movie Ghosts… of the Civil Dead, directed by John Hillcoat, was largely influenced by In the Belly of the Beast. Hillcoat had corresponded with Abbott after his return to incarceration. One of the movie's co-authors, Nick Cave, was also inspired when writing the song "Jack's Shadow". In Psycho II Meg Tilly's character is reading a copy of Belly of the Beast, while staying over in the Bates house.
