= George Frederick Morgan =

American poet

George Frederick Morgan (April 25, 1922 – February 20, 2004) was a poet, the co-founder (1947) and long-time editor (1948–1998) of the literary quarterly The Hudson Review and an heir to a fortune built on soap.

Morgan attended Princeton University, where he studied under Allen Tate. Morgan also translated poems from the French. After serving with US forces in World War II, he and Joseph Bennett, another Princeton graduate and veteran, established the Hudson Review in 1948. He edited the quarterly from 1948 until 1998, when he stepped down.

== Bibliography ==
- The Tarot of Cornelius Agrippa (1974) Sagarin Press
- The Night Sky (2002), Story Line Press
- The One Abiding (2003) Story Line Press
- Poems for Paula (1995), Story Line Press
- Poems: New and Selected (1987), University of Illinois Press
- Northbook (1982), University of Illinois Press
- Poems of the Two Worlds (1977), University of Illinois Press

== Personal life ==
Morgan was married three times and had six children. His third wife, Paula Dietz, in 1998 succeeded him as editor of The Hudson Review. One of Morgan's sons from an earlier marriage to Constance Canfield was the novelist Seth Morgan.
