= Seth Morgan (novelist) =

American novelist (1949–1990)

- Born: Seth David Morgan; April 4, 1949; New York City, U.S.
- Died: October 17, 1990 (aged 41); New Orleans, Louisiana, U.S.
- Resting place: Seaside Cemetery, Blue Hill, Maine, U.S.
- Occupation: Novelist
- Relatives: George Frederick Morgan (father)
- Writing career
- Notable work: Homeboy (1990)

Seth David Morgan (April 4, 1949 – October 17, 1990) was an American novelist, who published one book, Homeboy (1990), and was working on a second novel when he died. He was Janis Joplin's fiancé at the time of her death in October 1970.

== Early life ==
Morgan was the son of soap fortune heir and poet George Frederick Morgan, and Constance Canfield. The Esquire article, "Seth Morgan's Last Ride" (February 1, 1991), recounts Morgan's description of his mother and childhood: Morgan stated she was "an alcoholic beauty who drank herself to death in 1964", and he claimed that her coldness was to blame for his brother's suicide (by leaping to his death off the San Francisco-Oakland Bay Bridge). Morgan also believed that he inherited what he called his "addictive personality" from his alcoholic mother. He later said that he harbored intense bitterness towards women because of his mother's treatment of him and his siblings, and he spent years "planning the strategic degradation of women".

Morgan attended several elite private academies: St. Bernard's School in New York, from which he was expelled; Hotchkiss School in Connecticut, from which he was also expelled; The American School in Switzerland, from which he was also expelled; and The Butler Institute in Guadalajara, Mexico. He also briefly attended University of California Berkeley and received a trust fund income between US$26,000 and US$30,000 a year.

== Relationship with Janis Joplin ==
In 1970, Morgan dropped out of U.C. Berkeley. Later that year, he met singer Janis Joplin while allegedly delivering cocaine to her home in Marin County. The two began a relationship and became engaged. Their relationship became public knowledge in Joplin's obituary in TIME.

== Criminal record ==
After Joplin's death, Morgan married a Sausalito waitress. She worked as a prostitute during their marriage, while Morgan acted as her pimp. The marriage was short-lived, and Morgan later claimed he had married the woman to prevent her from suing him after the two had been involved in a motorcycle accident that left her face partially paralyzed (a drunken Morgan had crashed his Harley into a house formerly owned by Jack London).

Morgan then moved to San Francisco, where he married for a second time, found work as a barker at strip clubs, and developed an addiction to heroin. To support his habit, he began committing armed robberies. During one robbery, Morgan pinned a victim's hand to the floor with a knife. In 1977, the police caught him committing a robbery, and he was sentenced to 30 months in prison. After his release, he went back to working in strip clubs.

In 1986, he moved to New Orleans with, he later admitted, plans to drink himself to death but decided to write a novel, instead.

== Career ==
Morgan's only title published was Homeboy (1990), a novel about heroin addicts and criminals in San Francisco. In it, Morgan used several experiences from his own life, including time spent as a barker in San Francisco and his prison term for armed robbery. He included a character who was a flamboyantly dressed prostitute whom he said was based on Janis Joplin.

While incarcerated in the 1970s, Morgan had won the P.E.N. essay contest for convicts.

From 1986 to 1987, Morgan lived in the Lower Garden District of New Orleans, at 1232 St. Andrew Street, a rental property owned by Metairie resident Marcel Jaffe. During this time, Morgan was sober, spending his time writing, attending Alcoholics Anonymous and Narcotics Anonymous meetings, working out at the Lee's Circle YMCA, and hanging out at the Hummingbird Grill, a New Orleans greasy spoon that has since closed.

In the spring of 1990, the publication of Homeboy led to positive reviews and book-signing engagements for Morgan in several cities, including San Francisco, where 14 years earlier he had impaled a bystander's hand with a knife during an armed robbery. Morgan told Suzie Groover, who accompanied him on the publicity tour, that he was afraid of getting arrested on outstanding warrants from years earlier.

== Death ==
On October 16, 1990, Morgan was arrested in New Orleans for DUI and was released on bail that was paid by his girlfriend Suzy Levine. The following night, Morgan picked up Levine at a bar in the French Quarter, and departed at approximately 11:30 p.m., on Morgan's 1972 red and white Shovelhead Harley Davidson motorcycle. Shortly before midnight, Morgan and Levine were traveling on the St. Claude Avenue Bridge and hit the median strip, while he was attempting to maneuver into the right lane. Levine was thrown 45 feet down the roadway while Morgan crashed face first into a cement piling. Both were killed instantly.

An autopsy revealed that Morgan had Percodan and cocaine in his system, and his blood alcohol content was nearly three times the legal limit. Neither Morgan nor Levine were wearing helmets at the time of the crash.

Morgan is buried in the Seaside Cemetery in Blue Hill, Maine.

== Novel ==
Morgan's obituaries reported that at the time he died he was working on a second novel. Nearly four months later, a long article about Morgan in The Washington Post Style section quoted a representative of his publisher as saying Morgan left behind outlines for some of the chapters and nothing else. The spokesperson considered that detail important because company officials were glad they had given Morgan only a small advance to work on the novel even though he had pleaded for a lot more money, and the amount they insisted on giving him made him "bitter". The second novel was never published.

== See also ==
- Jack Abbott, ex-convict and author, whose works address prison life (among other topics)
- Jean Genet, ex-convict and novelist, whose works address prison life (among other topics)
