= Joanna Siedlecka =

Polish writer

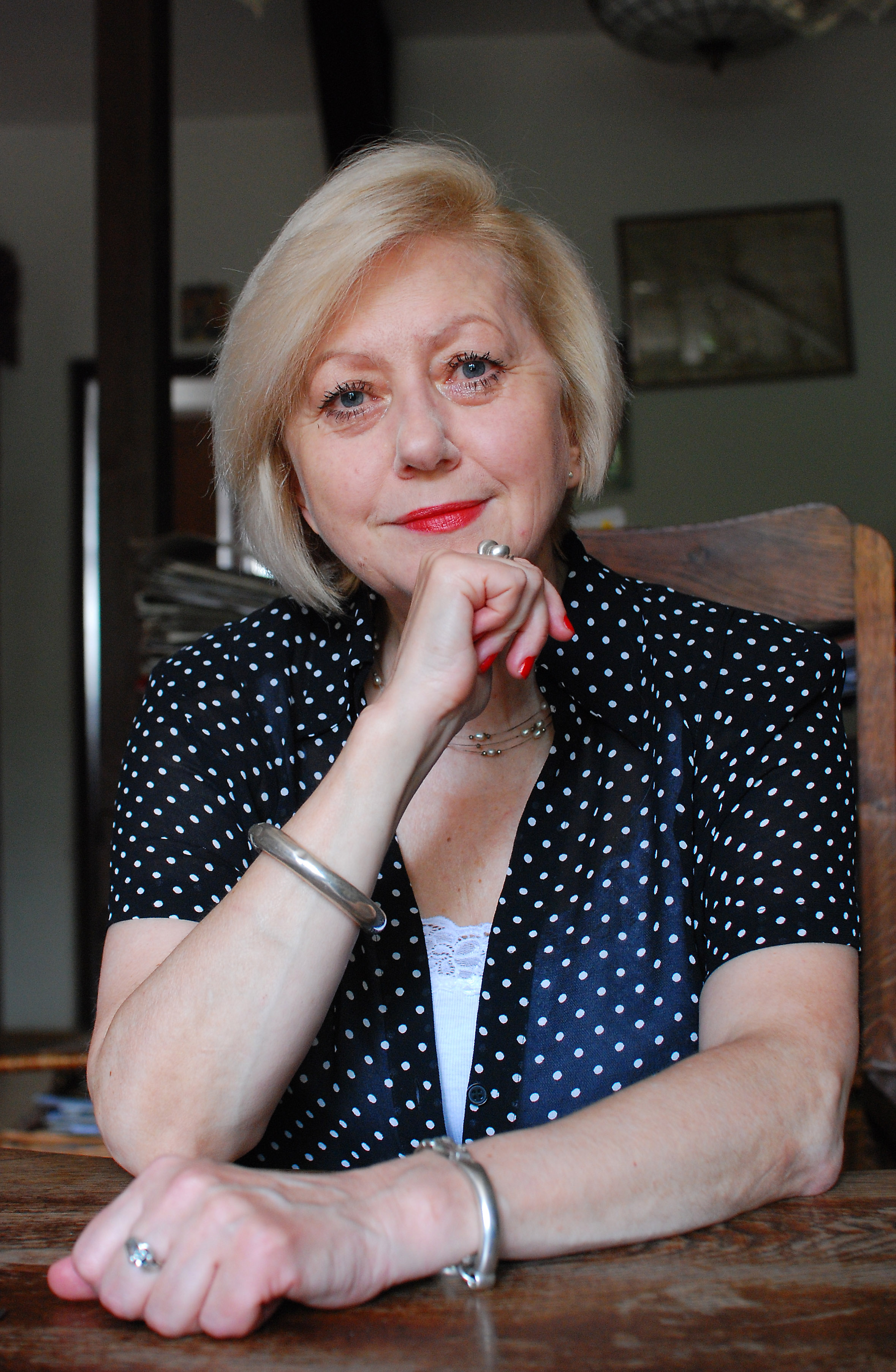
- Born: 24 February 1949 (age 77); Białystok, Poland
- Education: Warsaw University
- Occupations: writer, journalist

Joanna Siedlecka (born 24 February 1949 in Białystok, Poland) is a Polish writer, reporter, journalist, member of the Polish Writers Association (Stowarzyszenie Pisarzy Polskich), and the author of 10 books, 4 collections of essays and 6 biographies, notably, about the lives of writers: Witold Gombrowicz, Witkacy, and Jerzy Kosiński. Siedlecka is a lecturer at M. Wańkowicz College in Warsaw.

In her biography entitled The Ugly Black Bird, Siedlecka "contradicts the sanctioned version of Kosiński's life under the German occupation, which has generally been assumed to be only thinly disguised in his classic first novel The Painted Bird." (from an essay: "Writers Who Lie" by HNN)

== Works ==
=== Collections of Reportage ===
- Stypa (1981)
- Poprawiny (1984)
- Parszywa sytuacja (1984)
- Jaworowe dzieci (1991)

=== Biographies by Joanna Siedlecka ===
- Jaśnie Panicz (1987) ISBN 83-08-01587-5, about Witold Gombrowicz
- Mahatma Witkac (1992) ISBN 83-900182-2-5, about Witkacy
- Czarny ptasior (1993) ISBN 83-85458-04-2, about Jerzy Kosiński; translated to English as The Ugly Black Bird (2018) ISBN 978-1-7335238-0-6
- Wypominki (1996), ISBN 83-86788-14-3
- Pan od poezji (2002) ISBN 83-7337-175-3, about Zbigniew Herbert
- Wypominków ciąg dalszy, ISBN 83-207-1637-3

== Awards ==
- "Ksawery Pruszyński’s Prince of Reportage" (1976)
- "Polish Writers Association Award" (1978, 1980)
- "Leszek Prorok Award for Literature" (2000)
- "Warsaw Literary Premiere Award" (twice) for books Jaśnie Panicz and Pan od poezji.
