= The Painted Bird =

1965 novel by Jerzy Kosinski

- First edition cover
- Author: Jerzy Kosiński
- Language: English
- Genre: War novel
- Publisher: Houghton Mifflin
- Publication date: 1965
- Publication place: United States
- Media type: Print (hardcover and paperback)
- OCLC: 32548195
- Dewey Decimal: 813/.54 20
- LC Class: PS3561.O8 P3 1995
- Followed by: Steps

The Painted Bird is a 1965 novel by Jerzy Kosiński that describes World War II as seen by a boy, considered a "Gypsy or Jewish stray," wandering about small villages scattered around an unspecified country in Central or Eastern Europe (usually assumed to be Poland).

The story was originally described by Kosiński as autobiographical, but upon its publication by Houghton Mifflin he announced that it was a purely fictional account, although it was generally assumed that it was based on the author's experiences during World War II. The depicted events are now widely known to be fictional, having been the subject of a 1993 journalistic exposé (The Ugly Black Bird). The book was for many years regarded as an essential part of the literary Holocaust canon; since proven to be a work of fiction, it has lost much of its popularity.

The book describes the wandering boy's encounters with peasants engaged in all forms of sexual and social deviance such as incest, bestiality, and rape, and in other forms of extreme violence and lust. The book's title was drawn from an incident in the story. The boy, while in the company of a professional bird catcher, observes how the man took one of his captured birds and painted it several colors. Then he released the bird to fly in search of a flock of its kin, but when the painted bird came upon the flock, they saw it as an intruder and viciously attacked the bird until it fell from the sky.

== Plot summary ==
In 1939, at the beginning of World War II, a six-year-old boy living in the largest city of an Eastern European country invaded by Nazi Germany is sent by his parents to hide in the countryside because of their past anti-Nazi activities. However, they lose contact with him because of the chaos of the war and he is left stranded. As a result of his black hair and olive skin he is constantly accused of being either a Jew or a Gypsy, although Kosiński's narrator denies this. He also has trouble understanding the local languages and dialects of the peasants he encounters. His first caretaker is a superstitious and unhygienic old woman named Marta, who refuses to allow him to look into her eyes because she is worried his "Gypsy eye" will curse her. Marta eventually becomes ill and dies, and the boy accidentally burns down her hut after spilling kerosene on it. Left to fend for himself, he wanders alone from village to village seeking shelter and food from adults in exchange for work. The boy endures various kinds of violence and cruelty, sometimes hounded and tortured, only rarely sheltered and cared for.

He is saved from an angry mob of villagers by Olga, an elderly folk healer, who takes him under her wing. Although she openly distrusts the boy because of his appearance, she gains his admiration for her cures. After he becomes infected with a local epidemic, she buries him up to his head in dirt and he is attacked by birds but recovers. However, he is caught by the villagers again and thrown onto a large catfish's air bladder, which floats him down the river away from the village.

He is then taken in by a miller and his wife, who frequently exposes herself to a young plowboy. After the miller beats his wife for her alleged infidelity one night, he invites the plowboy over for dinner and gouges out his eyes. The boy runs away again and seeks shelter with Lekh, a professional bird catcher in love with Stupid Ludmila, a promiscuous and scantily-clad woman who lives in the woods alone with a large dog after suffering a mental breakdown from a gang rape. After Stupid Ludmila does not return to Lekh for several days, he becomes enraged and starts killing random birds by painting them different colors and setting them loose to be killed by their own flocks. After Lekh leaves to search for her, Stupid Ludmila returns and attempts to molest the boy. They are found by the villagers and she is raped by all of the local men and beaten to death by their jealous wives. The boy leaves as Lekh inconsolably cradles her body.

From here, he journeys to another village where a local carpenter takes care of him, but during a storm he becomes worried that the boy's black hair will attract lightning and chains him to a cart in the field. The boy escapes and flees into a forest by stowing away on a train, finding an abandoned pillbox infested with rabid rats. However, the boy accidentally returns to the old village, where the carpenter, blaming him after his barn was hit by lightning and burnt down, captures him and prepares to drown him before the boy pleads to spare his life in exchange for showing him the pillbox, which he falsely claims is filled with military supplies. When they reach the pillbox, the boy accidentally pushes the carpenter into the pillbox and he is eaten alive by the rats.

The boy next stays with a kindly and well-respected blacksmith in a village with constant skirmishes and reprisals by rival bands of partisans and the Wehrmacht. The smith and his family are beaten and killed by nationalist partisans, who decide to turn him over to a German outpost as a goodwill gesture. He is taken to the woods by an old German soldier, who sets him free and pretends to execute him.

He escapes and travels to another village next to a German military railway, where the villagers discover Jews and Gypsies being deported to a nearby concentration camp. The villagers approve of this turn of events, seeing it as retribution for the crucifixion of Jesus. One day, a young widower named Rainbow captures an injured Jewish girl who managed to escape from the train. The villagers resolve to hand her over to the Germans the next day. As the boy watches through a knothole that night, Rainbow rapes the girl and they become stuck together, with a local healer killing the girl.

After German patrols intensify, the boy is forced to leave the village to avoid giving away the location of a Jew in hiding. He is captured by German soldiers and taken to a larger town where he is harassed by a mob before an SS officer hands him over to a Catholic parish priest. The priest treats the boy kindly, but the farmer Garbos and his dog Judas constantly beat and abuse him. After hearing the priest explain prayer and indulgences, the boy asks him to teach him how to pray so that he can accrue enough indulgences to save himself. After the priest dies, Garbos starts torturing the boy by hanging him from the ceiling above Judas, and the boy begins praying more. On the Feast of Corpus Christi, the priest makes him an altar boy, but he nervously botches the Mass and knocks over a missal. The angered congregation accuses him of being a vampire and attempt to drown him in a cesspit. Although he survives, he becomes mute.

In the forest he is caught by the local boys and given to the farmer Makar, whose family was ostracized by the village. Makar's 19-year-old daughter Ewka begins furtively having sex with the boy, which he enjoys. After the boy is unable to kill a rabbit, Makar beats and temporarily paralyzes him. A few weeks later, the boy finds Makar, Ewka, and her older brother Anton having sex with each other and a goat in the field. Deciding that both they and the Germans became invincible by allying with demons, the boy flees into the forest again. While skating on a marsh, the boy is accosted by several young villagers who try to drown him after he accidentally wounds several of them with his skates. He is rescued by a woman named Labina, who later dies of a heart attack.

In 1944, the tide of the war turns as the Wehrmacht begins losing ground to the Red Army, and the locals begin arguing over the merits of the impending Soviet occupation. The boy wonders why God would allow the Soviets to win the war if they intended to abolish religion and private property. After the Germans withdraw from a village, Kalmyk deserters in their service conduct a brutal raid before the arriving Soviets capture and execute them. The boy is treated in a field hospital and allowed to stay with the soldiers, where he is taught to read and indoctrinated into Stalinism and atheism by the political commissar Gavrila. The boy begins to hope to join the Communist Party and becomes preoccupied with others' opinion of him. After several soldiers are killed by local peasants with axes, the boy accompanies the respected crack sniper Mitka the Cuckoo as he takes revenge by shooting several of the peasants.

Afterwards the boy is taken to an orphanage in his old home city, where he denounces the principal and two nurses to the Soviets after they punish him for refusing to remove his military uniform. When the school officials refuse to discipline him further, he begins refusing to learn his own native language and getting in fights with the other children. He befriends another mute named the Silent One, and they begin sneaking out into the city and getting into mischief. After the boys discover how to operate a railway switch and later get beaten by a dairy vendor, the Silent One uses the switch to derail a train in an unsuccessful murder attempt against the vendor. Eventually, at age 12, the boy is finally reunited with his parents after they identify him via a birthmark. However, the boy frequently misbehaves, breaking the arm of his four-year-old brother. After the war ends, he begins sneaking out at night to hang out with criminals and political dissidents before he is caught by the Militia. When the boy grows sickly, the family moves westward into the mountains on a doctor's advice and the boy is sent to live with a ski instructor. After injuring himself skiing in a blizzard, the boy receives a telephone call to his hospital room and upon hearing the caller suddenly is able to speak again for the first time in years.

== Literary significance and criticism ==
=== Early reception ===
The initial reception of the book was generally positive. In his 1965 editorial review Elie Wiesel wrote that the book was "one of the best ... Written with deep sincerity and sensitivity," a review written in The New York Times Book Review and quoted by the book's publisher. Richard Kluger, reviewing it for Harper's Magazine, wrote: "Extraordinary ... literally staggering ... one of the most powerful books I have ever read." And Jonathan Yardley, reviewing it for The Miami Herald, wrote: "Of all the remarkable fiction that emerged from World War II, nothing stands higher than Jerzy Kosiński's The Painted Bird. A magnificent work of art, and a celebration of the individual will. No one who reads it will forget it; no one who reads it will be unmoved by it. The Painted Bird enriches our literature and our lives". Time magazine included the novel in its "Time 100 Best English-language Novels from 1923 to 2005", accentuating the atrocities witnessed by the protagonist.

In 2011, American critic Ruth Franklin observed that the book, previously a prominent fixture in Holocaust studies, particularly in the context of literature studies, has seen a significant decline within curricula of American high school and colleges, which she attributed to concerns surrounding the work's authenticity.

=== Anti-Polish sentiment and reception in Poland ===
The book's reception in Poland was far from uniform. Initially it was subject to much criticism from both the communist and émigré press due to its perceived anti-Polish sentiment, although there have been dissenting views. Since then the views about the book in Poland remain divided and the book is most often described as controversial. In the opinion of some critics, the book is a masterpiece and a parable of human fate, while in the opinion of others, it is an anti-Polish hoax.

The book has been particularly poorly received by people whom Kosinski knew in his childhood and whom he wrote into the novel. As noted by Kosiński's American biographer James Sloan, one of the villagers who helped Kosiński's family during the war, whom he interviewed, "wept and said, 'We saved their lives, and he turned us into monsters.'" He also recounted another incident, when Kosinski visited Poland: “The people who had saved his life came to his Polish book signing. He couldn’t acknowledge them. He had to protect his myth.”

Polish author and critic Stanisław Lem wrote a review of The Painted Bird, which he titled "The Career of a Counterfeit." He stated that "Sexual parasitism on the era of genocide is one of the greatest abominations imaginable." Lem further adds about Kosiński: "Since the realism of German genocidal practices does not suit the sexual sadist very well, as it is a kind of industrialized slaughterhouse, and not an orgiastic panopticum, there comes to the rescue of authenticity the pseudologia pornographica." He also wrote that "This book, as a bestseller, received positive opinions from famous critics; what was abominable in it was interpreted as 'delirium' and 'phantasmagoria' of its child protagonist; the copulatory marathon of Polish peasants was seen as a dark reveal of the primitive wild 'Balkan' community; even some of our compatriots who realized that it was a lampoon [...] were ready to see a certain greatness in The Painted Bird, due to its boundless boldness and violence."

A number of non-Polish scholars and critics also commented on the anti-Polish sentiment present in the book. In 1996 D. G. Myers wrote that in the book, which he considers "an indispensable document of the Holocaust...although it may not be based on Kosinski’s own experiences," Kosinski "aims to exhibit the cruelty and backwardness of the Polish peasants." Writing in 1997 in The Polish Review, Thomas S. Gladsky described the book as an "attack on Poles." Norman Finkelstein wrote in The Holocaust Industry (2003) that Kosiński's book "depicts the Polish peasants he lived with as virulently anti-Semitic," even though they were fully aware of his Jewishness and "the dire consequences they themselves faced if caught." Kevin Hannan criticized the book in 2005, concluding that "The Painted Bird suggests a deceptive distortion of Polish history in the twentieth century, and the book demeans those Poles who risked their lives to save and shelter Jews such as Jerzy Kosinski." In 2022, the Polish critic and University of Rzeszów professor Elżbieta Rokosz in her chapter on controversies about Kosiński's book noted that "the novel was read as strongly anti-Polish."

In 2003, Polish literary critic and University of Warsaw professor Paweł Dudziak expressed a different view. Noting that The Painted Bird is a "great, if controversial" piece, he stressed that since the book is surreal – a fictional tale – and does not present, or claim to present – real world events, accusations of anti-Polish sentiment are nothing but a misunderstanding of the book by those who take it too literally.

=== Authorship controversy ===
According to Eliot Weinberger, contemporary American writer, essayist, editor, and translator, Kosiński was not the author of the book. Weinberger alleged in his 2000 collection Karmic Traces that Kosiński had very little fluent knowledge of English at the time of its writing.

M. A. Orthofer commented on Weinberger's assertion:

Kosiński was, in many respects, a fake – possibly near as genuine a one as Weinberger could want. (One aspect of the best fakes is the lingering doubt that, possibly, there is some authenticity behind them – as is the case with Kosiński.) Kosiński famously liked to pretend he was someone he wasn't (as do many of the characters in his books), he occasionally published under a pseudonym, and, apparently, he plagiarized and forged left and right.

=== Accusation of plagiarism ===
In June 1982, a Village Voice article claimed that Kosiński's books had actually been largely ghost-written by assistants, pointing to striking stylistic differences among Kosiński's novels. The New York poet, publisher and translator George Reavey claimed to have written The Painted Bird. However, in the opinion of Sloan, Reavey was simply embittered by his own lack of literary success.

The journalist John Corry, also a controversial author, wrote a 6,000-word feature article in The New York Times defending Kosiński, which appeared on the front page of the "Arts and Leisure" section in November 1982. Among other things, Corry alleged that "reports claiming that Kosiński was a plagiarist in the pay of the C.I.A. were the product of a Polish Communist disinformation campaign."

In 2012 Polish literary historian Monika Adamczyk-Garbowska from Lublin University wrote that The Painted Bird includes long excerpts lifted verbatim from a book published in the Second Polish Republic by the Polish-Jewish ethnographer Henryk Biegeleisen.

=== Controversy over supposed autobiographical elements ===
The Painted Bird was published and marketed as a fictional work although it was generally assumed that it was based on the author's experiences during World War II. Only later did it become clear to most reviewers that Kosiński was neither the boy in the story nor did he share any of the boy's experiences, as revealed in a series of articles in newspapers and books.^{(2)} The depicted events are now widely known to be fictional.

D. G. Myers, Associate Professor of English at Texas A&M University, reviewing a biography of Kosiński noted that initially, the author had passed off The Painted Bird as the true story of his own life during the Holocaust: "Long before writing it he regaled friends and dinner parties with macabre tales of a childhood spent in hiding among the Polish peasantry."

Among those who were fascinated was Dorothy de Santillana, a senior editor at Houghton Mifflin, to whom Kosiński confided that he had a manuscript based on his experiences." According to James Park Sloan, by the time the book was going into publication, Kosiński refrained from making further claims of the book being autobiographical – in a letter to de Santillana and in a subsequent author's note to the book itself. Kosiński nonetheless continued to assert that characterizing the novel as autobiographical "may be convenient for classification but is not easily justified" (the same language he used in his author's note and his pre-publication correspondence with de Santillana) in later interviews during his life.

The Village Voice article presented a different picture of Kosiński's life during the Holocaust – a view which was later supported by Joanna Siedlecka, a Polish biographer, in her 1993 exposé The Ugly Black Bird and Sloan. They revealed that The Painted Bird, assumed by many reviewers to be semi-autobiographical, was a work of fiction. Rather than wandering the Polish countryside, Kosiński and his parents had spent the war years in hiding with a Polish Catholic family who sheltered them from the Germans and that he had never been mistreated in any way.

Reviewing James Park Sloan's biography of Kosiński for The New York Times Book Review, Louis Begley wrote: "Perhaps the most surprising element of this aspect of Kosiński's mystifications is that he obtained from his mother, who was still alive in Poland – the father had died by the time The Painted Bird was published – a letter corroborating the claim that he had been separated from his family during the war."

Terence Blacker, an English publisher of Kosiński's books and an author of children's books and mysteries for adults, wrote in response to the article's accusations in 2002:

The significant point about Jerzy Kosinski was that ... his books ... had a vision and a voice consistent with one another and with the man himself. The problem was perhaps that he was a successful, worldly author who played polo, moved in fashionable circles and even appeared as an actor in Warren Beatty's Reds. He seemed to have had an adventurous and rather kinky sexuality which, to many, made him all the more suspect.

D. G. Myers responded to Blacker's assertions that much of Kosinski's behaviour was the result of "compensating for 'the hollowness at the core of his being'" in his review of Jerzy Kosiński: A Biography by James Park Sloan:

This theory explains much: the reckless driving, the abuse of small dogs, the thirst for fame, the fabrication of personal experience, the secretiveness about how he wrote, the denial of his Jewish identity. "There was a hollow space at the center of Kosiński that had resulted from denying his past," Sloan writes, "and his whole life had become a race to fill in that hollow space before it caused him to implode, collapsing inward upon himself like a burnt-out star." On this theory, Kosiński emerges as a classic borderline personality, frantically defending himself against ... all-out psychosis.

Norman Finkelstein wrote: "Long after Kosiński was exposed as a consummate literary hoaxer, Wiesel continued to heap encomiums on his 'remarkable body of work.'"

Discussing Kosiński's false claims, Lawrence L. Langer noted that during an interview for a television documentary in 1968, Kosiński claimed that "what happened to him was worse than what happened to the boy in the novel".

Fictitious Holocaust memoirs with which the novel has since been compared include Binjamin Wilkomirski's Fragments: Memories of a Wartime Childhood, Misha Defonseca's Misha: A Mémoire of the Holocaust Years and Herman Rosenblat's Angel at the Fence.

== Film adaptation ==
The novel was adapted into a feature-length film in 2019, directed and produced by Václav Marhoul.

== Music inspiration ==
The novel was the inspiration for Pearls Before Swine's "Morning Song" (1967), as well as for Siouxsie and the Banshees, who wrote a song called "Painted Bird" in 1982, on their album A Kiss in the Dreamhouse. The novel also inspired an album of the same name by avant-garde composer John Zorn. It has also inspired the name of musician Daniel Kahn's band Daniel Kahn & the Painted Bird.

== See also ==
- Anti-Polish sentiment
- Fake memoir
- Misery literature
- Rescue of Jews by Poles during the Holocaust
