= Ghosts... of the Civil Dead =

- Theatrical release poster
- Directed by: John Hillcoat
- Written by: Nick Cave; Gene Conkie; Evan English; John Hillcoat; Hugo Race
- Produced by: Evan English
- Starring: David Field; Chris DeRose; Nick Cave; Dave Mason
- Cinematography: Paul Goldman; Graham Wood
- Edited by: Stewart Young
- Music by: Nick Cave; Blixa Bargeld; Mick Harvey
- Production companies: Correctional Services; Outlaw Values
- Release date: December 1988 (Europe)
- Running time: 93 minutes
- Country: Australia
- Language: English
- Budget: A$1,680,000

Ghosts... of the Civil Dead is a 1988 Australian drama-suspense film directed by John Hillcoat. It was written by Hillcoat, Evan English, Gene Conkie, Nick Cave, and Hugo Race. It is partly based on the true story of Jack Henry Abbott.

== Synopsis ==
The story is set in Central Industrial Prison, a privately run maximum security prison in the middle of the Australian desert. An outbreak of violence within the prison has resulted in a total lockdown. A committee is appointed by the prison's governors to investigate the cause of the outbreak, but their findings are in stark contrast to the facts behind the riot.

It is revealed that both the prisoners and the guards are slowly and deliberately brutalised, manipulated and provoked into the forthcoming eruption of violence by the government and the private company that runs the prison, in order to justify the construction of a new and more "secure" facility.

== Production ==
The script was based on the book In the Belly of the Beast by Jack Henry Abbott and research done with David Hale, a former prison guard at Marion, Illinois. The film was shot at a disused aircraft factory in Melbourne in October and November.

== Origin of title ==
In Roman law, a person convicted of a crime where the punishment included loss of their legal rights as a person was civiliter mortuus, a person without civil rights.

== Reception ==
=== Accolades ===
Award	Category	Subject	Result
AACTA Awards (1989 Australian Film Institute Awards)	Best Film	Evan English	Nominated
AACTA Awards (1989 Australian Film Institute Awards)	Best Original Screenplay	Nick Cave	Nominated
AACTA Awards (1989 Australian Film Institute Awards)	Best Original Screenplay	John Hillcoat	Nominated
AACTA Awards (1989 Australian Film Institute Awards)	Best Original Screenplay	Hugo Race	Nominated
AACTA Awards (1989 Australian Film Institute Awards)	Best Original Screenplay	Gene Conkie	Nominated
AACTA Awards (1989 Australian Film Institute Awards)	Best Original Screenplay	Evan English	Nominated
AACTA Awards (1989 Australian Film Institute Awards)	Best Actor in a Leading Role	Mike Bishop	Nominated
AACTA Awards (1989 Australian Film Institute Awards)	Best Actor in a Supporting Role	Bogdan Koca	Nominated
AACTA Awards (1989 Australian Film Institute Awards)	Best Editing	Stewart Young	Nominated
AACTA Awards (1989 Australian Film Institute Awards)	Best Original Music Score	Nick Cave	Nominated
AACTA Awards (1989 Australian Film Institute Awards)	Best Original Music Score	Mick Harvey	Nominated
AACTA Awards (1989 Australian Film Institute Awards)	Best Original Music Score	Blixa Bargeld	Nominated
AACTA Awards (1989 Australian Film Institute Awards)	Best Sound	Bronwyn Murphy	Nominated
AACTA Awards (1989 Australian Film Institute Awards)	Best Sound	Rex Watts	Nominated
AACTA Awards (1989 Australian Film Institute Awards)	Best Sound	Peter Clancy	Nominated
AACTA Awards (1989 Australian Film Institute Awards)	Best Production Design	Chris Kennedy	Won
AACTA Awards (1989 Australian Film Institute Awards)	Best Costume Design	Karen Everett	Nominated
AACTA Awards (1989 Australian Film Institute Awards)	Best Costume Design	Beverly Jasper	Nominated

== Legacy ==
The spoken line "Welcome to Central Industrial. We are the future" has been sampled by Future Sound of London in their song "Central Industrial" on their Accelerator album; also sampled by Woob in their song "Void, Part One" on the album em:t 0094, and by Jam and Spoon in their remix of Moby's "Go".

Sonic Subjunkies samples various parts of the film in their songs "Central Industrial" and "Central Industrial II: The Lockdown".

Therapy? opened the song "Nausea" (the first one on their 1992 album Nurse) with a sample of Nick Cave shouting "Here I am, motherfuckers!" in the film.

== Bibliography ==
- Fuchs, Christian [1996] (2002). Bad Blood. Creation Books
