= Steps (book) =

1968 novel by Jerzy Kosiński

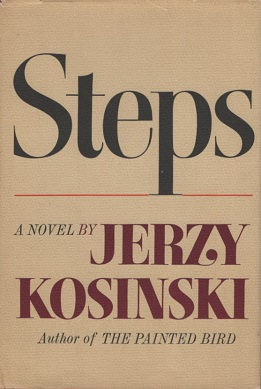
- First edition (US)
- Author: Jerzy Kosiński
- Language: English
- Publisher: Random House (US); The Bodley Head (UK)
- Publication date: 1968
- Publication place: United States
- Preceded by: The Painted Bird
- Followed by: Being There

Steps is a book by a Polish-American writer Jerzy Kosiński, released in 1968 by Random House. The work comprises scores of loosely connected vignettes or short stories, which explore themes of social control and alienation by depicting scenes rich in erotic and violent motives. It was Kosiński's second novel, a follow-up to his successful The Painted Bird released in 1965. Steps won the U.S. National Book Award for Fiction in 1969.

== Content ==
Steps consists of a series of short stories, reminiscences, anecdotes and dialogues, loosely linked to each other or having no connection at all, written in the first person. The book does not name any characters or places where described situations take place.

The book has been interpreted as being about "a Polish man's difficulties under the harsh Soviet regime at home played against his experiences as a new immigrant to the United States and its bizarre codes of capitalism." The stories reflect upon control, power, domination and alienation, depicting scenes full of brutality or sexually explicit. Steps contains remarkable autobiographical elements and numerous references to World War II.

== Reception ==
Despite its commercial failure, especially when compared to The Painted Bird, Steps met with generally positive critics' reviews and eventually won the U.S. National Book Award for Fiction in 1969. Canadian critic Hugh Kenner in his review of Steps in The New York Times compared it to the works by Louis-Ferdinand Céline and Franz Kafka.

In 1975, a freelance writer Chuck Ross, in order to prove his theory that unknown authors always find their books rejected, sent out excerpts from Steps to four different publishers, using the pseudonym Erik Demos. All four did not accept the sample. In 1977, Ross sent out the entire book to ten publishers, including Random House, which had originally published the book, and thirteen literary agents. Again, the book was rejected, also by Random House, having not been recognized, despite being an award-winning work.

American novelist David Foster Wallace in 1999 named Steps one of "five direly underappreciated U.S. novels", describing it as a "collection of unbelievably creepy little allegorical tableaux done in a terse elegant voice that's like nothing else anywhere ever." He further praised that "only Kafka's fragments get anywhere close to where Kosinski goes in this book, which is better than everything else he ever did combined."

== Release history ==
Year	Region	Title	Publisher
1968	United States	Steps	Random House
1968	Netherlands	Stappen	De Bezige Bij
1969	United Kingdom	Steps	The Bodley Head
1969	France	Les Pas	Groupe Flammarion
1970	Germany	Aus den Feuern	Droemer Knaur
1970	Norway	Trinn	Cappelen
1971	Italy	Passi	Mondadori
1971	Turkey	Adımlar	E Yayınları
1981	Spain	Pasos	Argos Vergara
1981	Croatia	Koraci	CIP
1985	Sweden	Steg	Tiden
1989	Poland	Kroki	PIW
1996	Czech Republic	Kroky	Argo
2009	Thailand	สเตปส์	ลายคราม
