= Cockpit (novel) =

1975 novel by Jerzy Kosiński

First edition (English) Published by Houghton Mifflin

Cockpit is a novel by Polish-American author Jerzy Kosiński, published in 1975.

== Plot ==
Cockpit is a debriefing after a long, tortuous mission. An agent known only as Tarden is a former operative of the mysterious security agency “the Service.” He has erased himself from all dossiers and transcripts. Now a fugitive, he moves across the landscape free of identity, in search of adventure and intrigue. But Tarden is a man of many disguises, and he is alternately avenger and savior, judge and trickster, as he enters the lives of others, forcing them into the arena of his judgment.

== Reception ==
The book was reviewed negatively in Kirkus: "...what's to redeem it beyond Kosinski's curiosity-catching legerdemain and quick changes of invention? Even while Tarden is flashing backwards and forwards, the reader feels as if he's marking time". According to an interview with Kosiński, Cockpit was well received by British audiences.
