= Being There (novel) =

1971 novel by Jerzy Kosinski

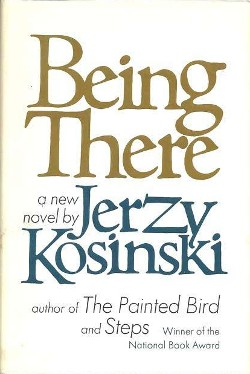
- First edition cover
- Author: Jerzy Kosinski
- Language: English
- Publisher: Harcourt Brace
- Publication date: 1971
- Pages: 165
- ISBN: 0-370-01453-7
- Preceded by: Steps
- Followed by: The Devil Tree

Being There is a satirical novel by the Polish-born writer Jerzy Kosinski, published April 21, 1971. Set in America, the story concerns Chance, a simple gardener who unwittingly becomes a much sought-after political pundit and commentator on the vagaries of the modern world.

A film based on the book was made in 1979; Kosinski co-wrote the film's screenplay with Robert C. Jones.

== Plot ==
The intellectually handicapped Chance works as a gardener for the Old Man, a retired senior lawyer. Chance's mother, also intellectually handicapped, died in childbirth; his father is unknown. He has lived in the Old Man's house all his life, never leaving the house and garden. All his needs (food and presumably clothing and laundry) are met by the Old Man via his servants. His only personal contact is with the servant tasked with servicing his needs.

Chance is illiterate. His only interests are tending the garden, with which he has a deep affinity, and watching TV. His name, or rather nickname, refers to the random circumstances of his birth, which never appears to have been registered. Nor is he recorded in any official records: he has never attended any school, been hospitalized, received any welfare benefit, or earned any income.

The Old Man dies, and the lawyers responsible for the estate tell Chance he must vacate. He does so, carrying all his possessions in a suitcase. While crossing the street, he is struck and slightly injured by a limousine owned by the elderly and terminally ill Benjamin Rand, a retired senior executive. Rand's much younger wife Elizabeth Eve ("E.E."), who was riding in the car at the time, insists that he be treated by her husband's doctor, and convalesce at their luxurious home. They mishear his name as 'Chauncey Gardiner' which becomes his de facto identity.

Chance possesses only scanty information picked up from TV, but his naïve and sometimes disconnected responses to questions and conversation are interpreted as oracular by his hearers, who seemingly go out of their way to provide context and ulterior meaning to his statements. Specifically, his statements regarding gardens and gardening (the only subject he knows) are interpreted as powerful metaphors for economic growth and cycles. Rand is the first to fall under his spell, and under Rand's sponsorship, he meets powerful and influential people, including business leaders, ambassadors and the President of the US, who mentions him on TV, as a result of which he appears on a current affairs show himself. The impression he makes is uniformly positive.

E.E. unsuccessfully tries to seduce Chance, viewing him as a possible successor to the dying Ben. Chance lacks knowledge of romantic relationships, having only learned from TV. At a party, a male guest tries similarly, to Chance's incomprehension, with equal lack of success. E.E. tries again, and Chance states the nearest thing to a philosophy: that seeing is preferable to touching since it is more broadly encompassing. E.E. exposes herself to him, though he makes no specific response and it is unclear what he gains from it.

Both the President and the Soviet ambassador try to get information about Chance's background, and both fail. The fact that each knows the other is trying creates a further imperative to find out. Finally, it is suggested that with his lack of "history", he is an ideal candidate for high office, possibly the Vice-Presidency (though this is not stated explicitly).

The story ends with Chance leaving a reception to find peace in the garden of the venue. It remains unclear to the end how much if anything he understands of the events of the story, which takes place over only a few days.

== Controversy ==
Professor Monika Adamczyk-Garbowska wrote that when Kosinski published Being There, "most Polish critics immediately recognized [his book] as a version of Kariera Nikodema Dyzmy (The Career of Nicodemus Dyzma) by Tadeusz Dolega-Mostowicz, a novel from the interwar period, and Kosinski was accused of plagiarism".
