= Jerzy Kosiński =

Polish-American writer (1933–1991)

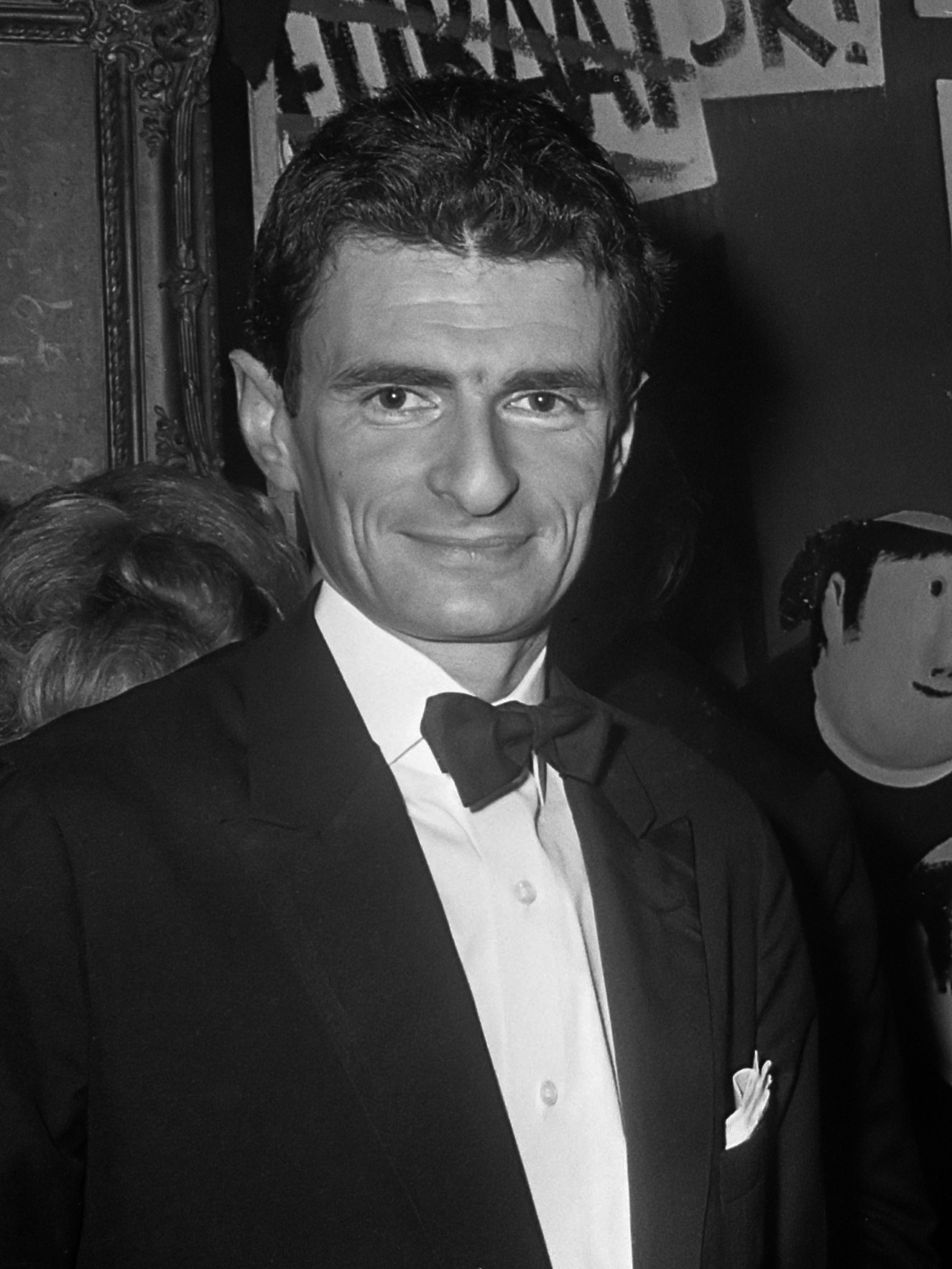
- Kosiński in 1969
- Born: Józef Nikodem Lewinkopf; June 14, 1933; Łódź, Poland
- Died: May 3, 1991 (aged 57); New York City, U.S.
- Education: University of Łódź
- Occupation: Novelist
- Spouses: Mary Hayward Weir (m. 1962; div. 1966) Katherina "Kiki" von Fraunhofer (m. 1968)

Signature
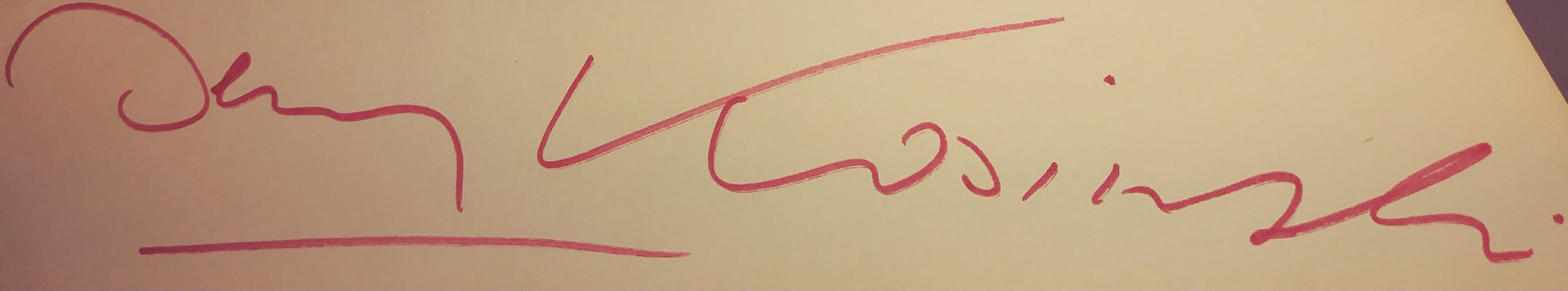

Jerzy Kosiński (Polish pronunciation: [ˈjɛʐɨ kɔˈɕij̃skʲi]; born Józef Nikodem Lewinkopf; June 14, 1933 – May 3, 1991) was a Polish-born American writer and two-time president of the American chapter of PEN, who wrote primarily in English.

Born in Poland to Jewish parents, he and his family survived World War II with the help of their Polish villager neighbors. After mandatory military service and education under Poland's communist government, he emigrated to the United States and became a U.S. citizen.

He was known for novels including Being There (1971) and the controversial The Painted Bird (1965), which were adapted as films, respectively, in 1979 and 2019.

== Life ==
Kosiński was born in 1933 as Józef Nikodem Lewinkopf in Łódź, as the only child of Polish Jews Mieczysław (Mojżesz) Lewinkopf and Elżbieta Liniecka. As a child during World War II, he lived in occupied central Poland under a false identity, Jerzy Kosiński, which his father gave him. Eugeniusz Okoń, a Catholic priest, issued him a forged baptismal certificate, and the Lewinkopf family survived the Holocaust thanks to local villagers who offered assistance to Polish Jews, at grave personal risk. Kosiński's father was assisted not only by town leaders and clergymen, but by individuals such as Marianna Pasiowa, a member of an underground network that helped Jews evade capture.

The family lived openly in Dąbrowa Rzeczycka, near Stalowa Wola, and attended church in nearby Wola Rzeczycka, with the support of villagers in Kępa Rzeczycka. For a time, they were sheltered by a Catholic family in Rzeczyca Okrągła. Jerzy even served as an altar boy in the local church.

After the war, Kosiński's father aligned himself with Poland's communist regime, and the family was relatively well off. Kosiński and his parents moved to Jelenia Góra. By age 22 he had earned degrees in history and sociology at the University of Łódź. He then became a teaching assistant at the Polish Academy of Sciences. Kosiński also studied in the Soviet Union, and served as a sharpshooter in the Polish Army. A biographer writes that Kosinski disliked conformity and therefore the communism that his father had sworn allegiance to, and because of this developed anti-communist views.

In order to emigrate to the United States in 1957, he created a fake foundation which ostensibly sponsored him, and forged letters from prominent communist authorities guaranteeing his return to Poland, which were then required for anyone leaving the country.

Kosiński first worked at odd jobs to get by, including driving a truck, and he managed to graduate from Columbia University. In 1965 he became an American citizen. In 1967 he received a Guggenheim Foundation fellowship, and in 1968 a grant from the Ford Foundation. In 1970 he won an American Academy of Arts and Letters award for literature. The grants allowed him to write a political nonfiction book that opened new doors of opportunity. He became a lecturer at Yale, Princeton, Davenport, and Wesleyan Universities.

Kosiński practiced photographic art, with a 1957 one-man exhibition at Warsaw's Crooked Circle [Krzywe Koło] Gallery and a 1988 exhibition at New York's Andre Zarre Gallery.

In 1962 Kosiński married an American steel heiress, Mary Hayward Weir, eighteen years his senior; four years later they divorced. Weir died in 1968 from brain cancer, leaving Kosiński out of her will. He fictionalized the marriage in his novel Blind Date, describing Weir under the name Mary-Jane Kirkland. In 1968 he married Katherina "Kiki" von Fraunhofer (1933–2007), a marketing consultant and descendant of Bavarian nobility.

=== Death ===
Toward the end of his life Kosiński suffered from multiple illnesses, and questions arose regarding plagiarism in his work. By his late 50s he was suffering from an irregular heartbeat.

He died by suicide on May 3, 1991, by ingesting a lethal amount of alcohol and drugs and wrapping a plastic bag around his head, suffocating himself. His suicide note read: "I am going to put myself to sleep now for a bit longer than usual. Call it Eternity." Per his wishes, Kosiński was cremated and Oscar de la Renta spread his ashes near his home in the Dominican Republic, off a small cove in Casa de Campo.

== Notable novels ==
Kosiński's novels have appeared on The New York Times Best Seller list, and have been translated into over 30 languages, with total sales estimated at 70 million in 1991.

=== The Painted Bird ===
The Painted Bird, Kosiński's controversial 1965 novel, is a fictional account that depicts the personal experiences of a boy of unknown religious and ethnic background who wanders around unidentified areas of Eastern Europe during World War II and takes refuge among a series of people, many of whom are brutally cruel and abusive, either to him or to others.

Soon after the book was published in the US, Kosiński was accused by the then-Communist Polish government of being anti-Polish, especially following the regime's 1968 anti-Zionist campaign. The book was banned in Poland from its initial publication until the fall of the Communist government in 1989. When it was finally printed, thousands of Poles in Warsaw lined up for as long as eight hours to purchase copies of the work autographed by Kosiński. Polish literary critic and University of Warsaw professor Paweł Dudziak remarked that "in spite of the unclear role of its author, The Painted Bird is an achievement in English literature." He stressed that, because the book is a work of fiction and does not document real-world events, accusations of anti-Polish sentiment may result only from taking it too literally.

The book received recommendations from Elie Wiesel who wrote in The New York Times Book Review that it was "one of the best ... Written with deep sincerity and sensitivity." Richard Kluger, reviewing it for Harper's Magazine wrote: "Extraordinary ... literally staggering ... one of the most powerful books I have ever read." Jonathan Yardley, reviewing it for The Miami Herald, wrote: "Of all the remarkable fiction that emerged from World War II, nothing stands higher than Jerzy Kosiński's The Painted Bird. A magnificent work of art, and a celebration of the individual will. No one who reads it will forget it; no one who reads it will be unmoved by it."

=== Steps ===
Steps (1968), a novel comprising scores of loosely connected vignettes, won the U.S. National Book Award for Fiction.

American novelist David Foster Wallace described Steps as a "collection of unbelievably creepy little allegorical tableaux done in a terse elegant voice that's like nothing else anywhere ever". Wallace continued in praise: "Only Kafka's fragments get anywhere close to where Kosiński goes in this book, which is better than everything else he ever did combined." Samuel Coale, in a 1974 discussion of Kosiński's fiction, wrote that "the narrator of Steps for instance, seems to be nothing more than a disembodied voice howling in some surrealistic wilderness."

=== Being There ===
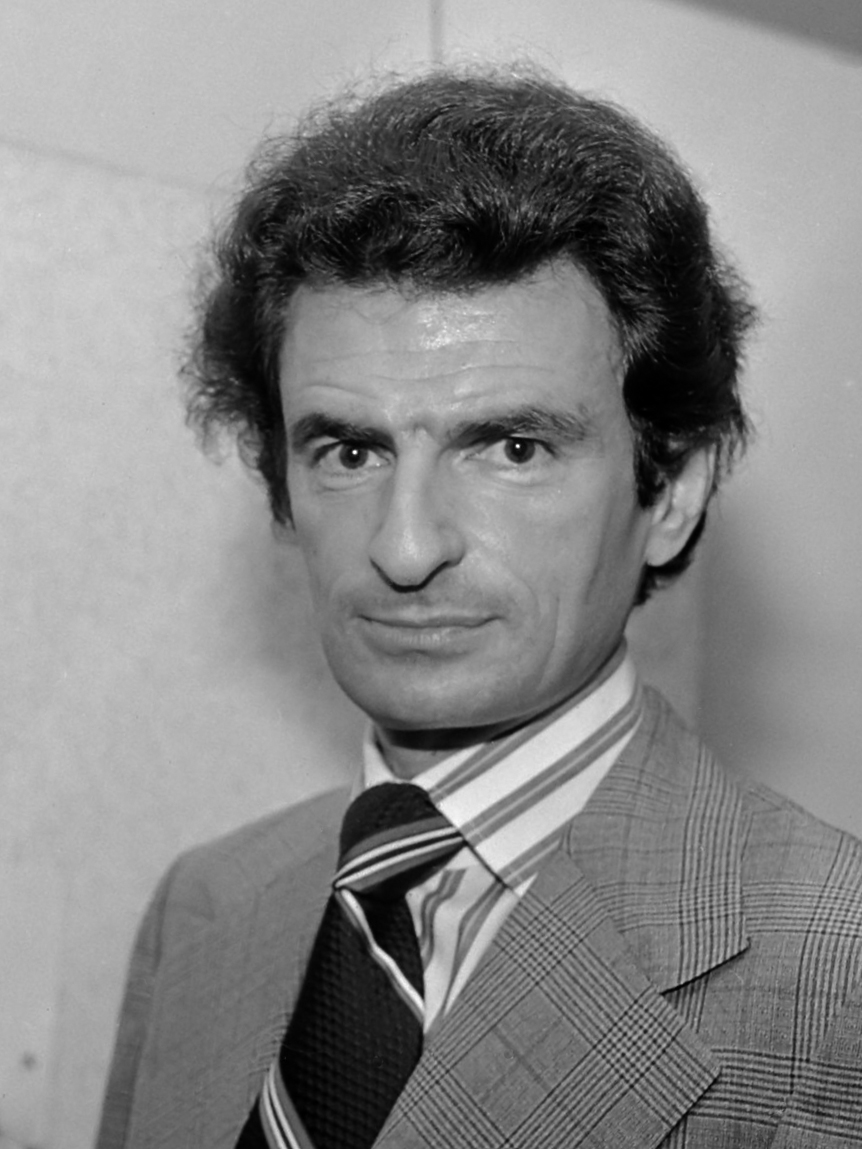
Jerzy Kosiński (1973)

One of Kosiński's more significant works is Being There (1971), a satirical view of the absurd reality of America's media culture. It is the story of Chance the gardener, a man with few distinctive qualities who emerges from nowhere and suddenly becomes the heir to the throne of a Wall Street tycoon and a presidential policy adviser. His simple and straightforward responses to popular concerns are praised as visionary despite the fact that no one actually understands what he is really saying. Many questions surround his mysterious origins, and filling in the blanks in his background proves impossible.

The novel was made into a 1979 movie directed by Hal Ashby, and starring Peter Sellers, who was nominated for an Academy Award for the role, and Melvyn Douglas, who won the award for Best Supporting Actor. The screenplay was co-written by award-winning screenwriter Robert C. Jones and Kosiński. The film won the 1981 British Academy of Film and Television Arts (Film) Best Screenplay Award, as well as the 1980 Writers Guild of America Award (Screen) for Best Comedy Adapted from Another Medium. It was nominated for the 1980 Golden Globe Best Screenplay Award (Motion Picture).

== Criticism ==
According to Eliot Weinberger, an American writer, essayist, editor and translator, Kosiński was not the author of The Painted Bird. Weinberger alleged in his 2000 book Karmic Traces that Kosiński was not fluent in English at the time of its writing.

In a review of Jerzy Kosiński: A Biography by James Park Sloan, D.G. Myers, associate professor of English at Texas A&M University wrote "For years Kosinski passed off The Painted Bird as the true story of his own experience during the Holocaust. Long before writing it he regaled friends and dinner parties with macabre tales of a childhood spent in hiding among the Polish peasantry. Among those who were fascinated was Dorothy de Santillana, a senior editor at Houghton Mifflin, to whom Kosiński confided that he had a manuscript based on his experiences. Upon accepting the book for publication, Santillana said 'It is my understanding that, fictional as the material may sound, it is straight autobiography'. Although he backed away from this statement, Kosiński never wholly disavowed it."

M.A. Orthofer addressed Weinberger's assertion: "Kosinski was, in many respects, a fake – possibly near as genuine a one as Weinberger could want. (One aspect of the best fakes is the lingering doubt that, possibly, there is some authenticity behind them – as is the case with Kosinski.) Kosinski famously liked to pretend he was someone he wasn't (as do many of the characters in his books), he occasionally published under a pseudonym, and, apparently, he plagiarized and forged left and right."

Kosiński addressed these claims in the introduction to the 1976 reissue of The Painted Bird, saying that "Well-intentioned writers, critics, and readers sought facts to back up their claims that the novel was autobiographical. They wanted to cast me in the role of spokesman for my generation, especially for those who had survived the war; but for me, survival was an individual action that earned the survivor the right to speak only for himself. Facts about my life and my origins, I felt, should not be used to test the book's authenticity, any more than they should be used to encourage readers to read The Painted Bird. Furthermore, I felt then, as I do now, that fiction and autobiography are very different modes."

=== Plagiarism allegations ===
In June 1982, a Village Voice report by Geoffrey Stokes and Eliot Fremont-Smith alleged Kosiński wrote The Painted Bird in Polish, and had it secretly translated into English. The report said that Kosiński's books had been ghost-written by "assistant editors", finding stylistic differences among Kosiński's novels. Kosiński, according to them, had depended upon his freelance editors for "the sort of composition that we usually call writing." American biographer James Sloan notes that New York poet, publisher and translator George Reavey said he had written The Painted Bird for Kosiński.

The article found a more realistic picture of Kosiński's life during the Holocaust – a view which was supported by biographers Joanna Siedlecka and Sloan. The article asserted that The Painted Bird, assumed to be semi-autobiographical, was largely a work of fiction. The information showed that rather than wandering the Polish countryside, as his fictional character did, Kosiński spent the war years in hiding with Polish Catholics.

Journalist John Corry wrote a 6,000-word feature article in The New York Times in November 1982, responding and defending Kosiński, which appeared on the front page of the Arts and Leisure section. Among other things, Corry alleged that reports that "Kosinski was a plagiarist in the pay of the C.I.A. were the product of a Polish Communist disinformation campaign."

In 1988, Kosiński wrote The Hermit of 69th Street, in which he sought to demonstrate the absurdity of investigating prior work by inserting footnotes for practically every term in the book. "Ironically," wrote theatre critic Lucy Komisar, "possibly his only true book ... about a successful author who is shown to be a fraud."

In an essay published in New York in 1999, Kosiński's sometime lover, Laurie Stieber, wrote that he incorporated passages from her letters into the revised and expanded 1981 edition of his 1973 novel The Devil Tree, without asking her. "The allegations in the Voice," wrote Stieber, "combined with what I knew to be true about the revised edition of The Devil Tree, left me with a gnawing mistrust in all aspects of our relationship. I hadn’t wavered, however, from my opinion that he was an extraordinary intellectual and philosopher, a brilliant storyteller and, yes, writer. But ego, and the fear of having his credibility strip-searched by erudite Polish or Russian editors, were behind his insistence on writing in English rather than using translators. By borrowing too greedily, Jerzy inadvertently wrote the Village Voice article himself."

Terence Blacker, an English publisher (who helped publish Kosiński's books) and author of children's books and mysteries for adults, wrote an article published in The Independent in 2002:

The significant point about Jerzy Kosiński was that...his books...had a vision and a voice consistent with one another and with the man himself. The problem was perhaps that he was a successful, worldly author who played polo, moved in fashionable circles and even appeared as an actor in Warren Beatty's Reds. He seemed to have had an adventurous and rather kinky sexuality which, to many, made him all the more suspect. All in all, he was a perfect candidate for the snarling pack of literary hangers-on to turn on. There is something about a storyteller becoming rich and having a reasonably full private life that has a powerful potential to irritate so that, when things go wrong, it causes a very special kind of joy.

Despite repudiation of the Village Voice allegations of plagiarism in detailed articles in The New York Times, The Los Angeles Times, and other publications, Kosiński remained tainted. "I think it contributed to his death," said Zbigniew Brzezinski, a friend and fellow Polish emigrant.

== Television, radio, film, and newspaper appearances ==
Kosiński appeared 12 times on The Tonight Show Starring Johnny Carson during 1971–1973, and The Dick Cavett Show in 1974, was a guest on the talk radio show of Long John Nebel, posed half-naked for a cover photograph by Annie Leibovitz for The New York Times Magazine in 1982, and presented the Oscar for screenwriting in 1982.

He also played the role of Bolshevik revolutionary and Politburo member Grigory Zinoviev in Warren Beatty's film Reds. The Time magazine critic wrote: "As Reed's Soviet nemesis, novelist Jerzy Kosinski acquits himself nicely–a tundra of ice against Reed's all-American fire." Newsweek complimented Kosiński's "delightfully abrasive" performance.

== Friendships ==
Kosiński was friends with Roman Polanski, with whom he attended the National Film School in Łódź, and said he narrowly missed being at Polanski and Sharon Tate's house on the night Tate was murdered by Charles Manson's followers in 1969, due to lost luggage. His novel Blind Date portrayed the Manson murders. In 1984, Polanski denied Kosiński's story in his autobiography. Journalist John Taylor of New York Magazine believes Polanski was mistaken. "Although it was a single sentence in a 461-page book, reviewers focused on it. But the accusation was untrue: Jerzy and Kiki had been invited to stay with Tate the night of the Manson murders, and they missed being killed as well only because they stopped in New York en route from Paris because their luggage had been misdirected." The reason why Taylor believes this is that "a friend of Kosiński wrote a letter to the Times, which was published in the Book Review, describing the detailed plans he and Jerzy had made to meet that weekend at Polanski's house on Cielo Drive." The letter referenced was written by Clement Biddle Wood.

Svetlana Alliluyeva, who had a friendship with Kosiński, is introduced as a character in his novel Blind Date.

Kosiński wrote his novel Pinball (1982) for his friend George Harrison, having conceived of the idea for the book at least 10 years before writing it.

== Bibliography ==
- The Future Is Ours, Comrade: Conversations with the Russians (1960), published under the pseudonym "Joseph Novak"
- No Third Path (1962), published under the pseudonym "Joseph Novak"
- The Painted Bird (1965, revised 1976)
- The Art of the Self: Essays à propos Steps (1968)
- Steps (1968)
- Being There (1971)
- By Jerzy Kosinski: Packaged Passion. (1973)
- The Devil Tree (1973, revised & expanded 1982)
- Cockpit (1975)
- Blind Date (1977)
- Passion Play (1979)
- Pinball (1982)
- The Hermit of 69th Street (1988, revised 1991)
- Passing By: Selected Essays, 1962–1991 (1992)
- Oral Pleasure: Kosinski as Storyteller (2012)

== Filmography ==
- Being There (novel and screenplay, cameo in gala scene, 1979)
- Reds (actor, 1981) – Grigory Zinoviev
- The Statue of Liberty (1985) – Himself
- Łódź Ghetto (1989) – Mordechai Chaim Rumkowski (voice)
- Religion, Inc. (actor, 1989) – Beggar (final film role)
- Nabarvené ptáče (film) (2019, orig. The Painted Bird)

== Awards and honors ==
- 1966 – Prix du Meilleur Livre Étranger (essay category) for The Painted Bird
- 1969 – National Book Award for Steps.
- 1970 – Award in Literature, National Institute of Arts and Letters and American Academy of Arts and Letters
- 1973–75 – President of the American Chapter of P.E.N. Re-elected 1974, serving the maximum permitted two terms
- 1974 – B'rith Shalom Humanitarian Freedom Award
- 1977 – American Civil Liberties Union First Amendment Award
- 1979 – Writers Guild of America, East Best Screenplay Award for Being There (shared with screenwriter Robert C. Jones)
- 1980 – Polonia Media Perspectives Achievement Award
- 1981 – British Academy of Film and Television Arts (BAFTA) Best Screenplay of the Year Award for Being There
- International House Harry Edmonds Life Achievement Award
- Received PhD Honoris Causa in Hebrew Letters from Spertus College of Judaica
- 1988 – Received PhD Honoris Causa in Humane Letters from Albion College, Michigan
- 1989 – Received PhD Honoris Causa in Humane Letters from State University of New York at Potsdam

== See also ==
- Misery literature
