= Murder of Collin Small =

2024 murder in New York City, U.S.

- Date: March 5, 2024; 2 years ago
- Location: Highbridge, Bronx, New York City, U.S.
- Type: Crime, murder
- Deaths: 1

On March 5, 2024, 44-year-old Collin Small was shot and killed in his sixth-floor Highbridge apartment in the Bronx, New York City. NYPD officers discovered Small's dismembered torso and feet stashed in a freezer and blue bin during a wellness check later the same day; his cause of death was a single gunshot to the head. Sheldon Johnson Jr., 48, who was found inside the apartment at the time and was recorded by surveillance cameras going in and out of the building, was charged with Small's murder, as well as manslaughter, weapon possession and concealment of a corpse. Johnson, a former Bloods gang member and criminal justice activist, had been released early from Sing Sing on May 4, 2023, after serving 25 years of a 50-year sentence he received for an act of attempted murder during a robbery. Small's head, legs and one of his arms were later recovered at Johnson's apartment in Harlem.

== Murder ==
Collin Small was last seen alive at around 10 p.m. on March 4 by the building superintendent of Small's apartment complex. Surveillance footage showed Small entering his apartment by himself. The next morning, the superintendent was called by a tenant who reported hearing two gunshots at around 1 a.m., after which she had heard a man shouting "Please don't, I have a family", followed by another two shots. The superintendent checked the CCTV on Small's floor, which had captured a man later identified as Sheldon Johnson repeatedly exiting and entering the apartment in different clothes, including hats, a blond wig and the same outfit the victim had been wearing when he entered the apartment, returning with cleaning supplies and a blue bin, in which parts of Small's body were later found. The superintendent called 911 at 11:30 a.m. to conduct a wellness check, which occurred at 8:25 p.m. and upon arrival, the officers were met with Johnson, who claimed that Small had "gone upstate". Johnson was taken into custody after a search recovered human body parts later identified as belonging to Small in the apartment. Police also found concrete and a Tyvek suit in Johnson's car.

== Victim ==
=== Background ===
Collin Small was born in 1979 and grew up in Harlem, developing a friendship with Sheldon Johnson as a child. Small was twice convicted of felony assault, serving a 10-year sentence in Sing Sing before being paroled in October 2018. Small's family described him and Johnson as "long-time friends" and that Small had been supporting Johnson since his release from prison.

== Accused ==
=== Background ===
Sheldon Preston Johnson Jr. was born on May 6, 1975, at Mount Sinai Hospital in Brooklyn, New York City as the eldest child to a deaf-mute couple, Sheldon Preston Johnson Sr. and Theresa Susan Brunson, an African-American of partial Native American descent from Trenton, New Jersey and Italian-American immigrant from Sicily respectively. The Johnsons resided on 112th Street and Fifth Avenue in East Harlem and lived in poverty due to their disability preventing the parents from finding work, compounded by Johnson Sr.'s addiction to crack cocaine, living primarily off of welfare and disability checks. Johnson Sr. separated from his wife in 1978 and started a family with another woman. In 1986, he was convicted of rape after sexually assaulting his seven-year-old stepdaughter three times because "his [second] wife refused to have sexual relations with him because she was angry at his continued drug use" and given five years probation by judge Joseph Falcone, who claimed a harsher sentence "would entail excessive hardship" for his family, who depended on him as the breadwinner; he moved out of the house due to a court order requiring Johnson Sr. to stay away from his stepdaughter. Johnson, who was versed in American Sign Language, kept contact with his father, aiding him in buying crack from dealers by acting as an interpreter as late as 1993.

Johnson was first arrested in 1985, when he sprayed his 5th grade math teacher with a fire extinguisher after failing to stab him with a concealed kitchen knife. According to Johnson, the teacher had regularly abused him by hitting his hands with a ruler as corporal punishment for participating in school fights in the months before. He was sent to the psychiatric wards of Mount Sinai in Manhattan, Metropolitan Hospital, Pleasantville Cottage School, and Hawthorne Cedar Knolls. Johnson alleged that he was kept sedated during most of his institutionalization, as well as molested by a psychiatrist and raped by a staff member at Hawthorne. Johnson attacked the latter with a knife, but was not charged after he reported the abuse to administration. He ran away from the facility 11 months after being first brought in. He subsequently dropped out of sixth grade and lived homeless as a squatter. At age 12, he was recruited by a childhood friend, a 19-year-old named Shameek, to work as a drug runner, selling narcotics including cocaine to people from Buffalo to Pennsylvania over the course of the next seven years. Johnson was arrested and jailed several times in connection to the trafficking ring, which he eventually came to lead. In 1994, after previously eluding police capture by jumping from the fifth floor apartment he lived in with his girlfriend and their infant son, Johnson was arrested at a hospital and charged with drug trafficking, kidnapping and other felonies. He spent two years on Rikers Island and was acquitted in 1996. He reportedly joined the Bloods early into his stay in 1995, after a Latin King gang member slashed his cheek with a razor blade.

Following his release, Johnson committed a series of robberies targeting people that owed him unpaid protection money during his time in prison. During one such robbery, Johnson non-fatally shot a man in the back as he attempted to flee from him. He was arrested under the alias Thomas Smalls in Manhattan for possession of stolen property in 1997 and months later on December 21, he was arrested for attempted murder and robbery. In 1999, after rejecting a plea deal that would have Johnson serve 23 years in prison, he received a sentence of 50 years without parole for 41 years. He spent his sentence at Great Meadow Correctional Facility, Green Haven CF, Auburn CF, and Sing Sing, during which time he reportedly served time along with Collin Small. In 2005, Johnson, who described himself as a "high-ranking member" and "big shot" in the Bloods hierarchy by this point, cut ties with the gang.

In April 2008, while still imprisoned, his now 14-year-old son, also named Sheldon Johnson, was charged with manslaughter for the April 4 death of 24-year-old Columbia University international student Minghui Yu (于明辉) in Morningside Heights, after Yu was struck and killed by a passing SUV as a result of the youth punching him in the back of the head in a random unprovoked attack after being encouraged by friends; he was not convicted and instead ordered to 18 months in a juvenile detention boot camp, moving to Florida to live with his mother afterwards.

While incarcerated, Johnson helped create numerous prison rehabilitation programs, including "The Dyslexia Screening-Identification and Intervention program" and "The Civic Engagement Curriculum of New York". He earned a GED and gained an associate degree in liberal arts through a Cornell University-funded correspondence course college program. In 2010, Johnson reconciled with his father, who had gone clean in 2002 and remarried. After his release, Johnson began working as a paralegal for prison rehabilitation activist groups.

On February 1, 2024, only a month before the murder of Collin Small, Johnson was featured as a guest on The Joe Rogan Experience podcast, wherein he talked about his criminal history and advocated for prison rehabilitation.
