= Monika Adamczyk-Garbowska =

Polish literature expert and professor of humanistic studies

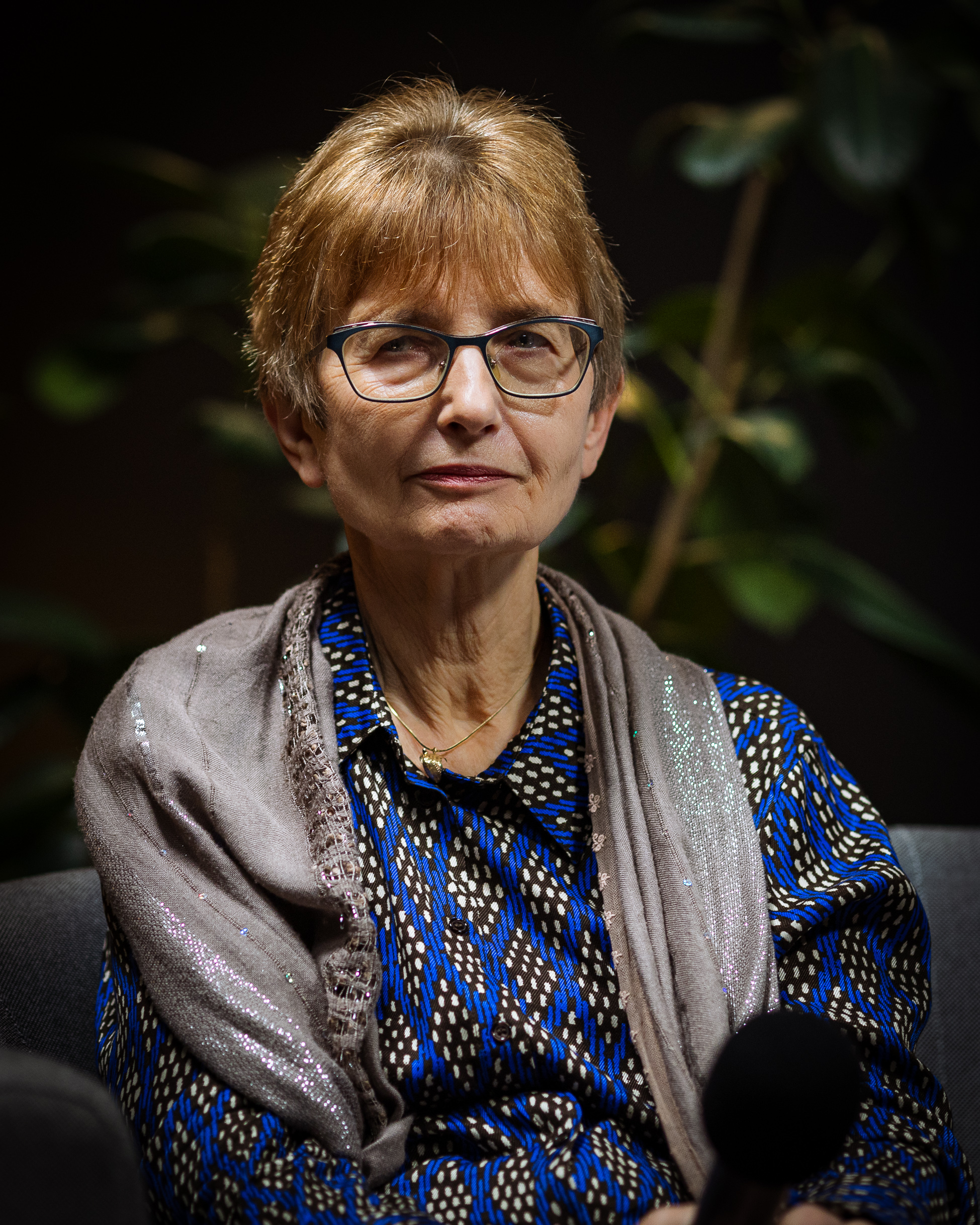
- Monika Adamczyk-Garbowska (2024)
- Born: 1956 (age 69–70); Lublin
- Education: Professor
- Scientific career
- Fields: American literature, Yiddish literature, comparative literature

Monika Antonina Adamczyk-Garbowska (born 1956 in Lublin) is a Polish literature expert, professor of humanistic studies, and expert in the field of American and comparative literature.

== Biography ==
She got her habilitation in 1995. She is the manager of the Institute for Jewish Culture and History (Zakład Kultury i Historii Żydów) in the Humanistic department of Maria Curie-Skłodowska University. Her job is translating literature from English and Yiddish. She is also an editor for the magazine "Akcent". Member of the editorial office in charge of the newspaper "Polin: Studies in Polish Jewry” published by Brandeis University in the United States.

From 1998 to 1999 she was a Fulbright Visiting Scholar at Brandeis University.

== Publications ==
- Polska Isaaca Bashevisa Singera – rozstanie i powrót (1994)
- Contemporary Jewish Writing in Poland. An Anthology (2001, along with Antony Polonsky)
- Odcienie tożsamości. Literatura żydowska jako zjawisko wielojęzyczne (2004)
- Kazimierz vel Kuzmir. Miasteczko różnych snów (2006)
- Następstwa zagłady Żydów. Polska 1944–2010 (co-editor: Feliks Tych, 2011)

== Translations ==
- Fredzia Phi-Phi (1986) – translation of Winnie the Pooh
- Sztukmistrz z Lublina (2024) – translation of The Magician of Lublin (the Polish translation was done directly from Yiddish and not from English, as it was done before)

== Awards ==
In 2004 she received the scientific award, named after Jan Karski and Pola Nireńska, for studies on Yiddish literature.
