= James Park Sloan =

American author, critic, and academic (born 1945)

James Park Sloan (born 1945) is an American author, critic, and academic. He was a professor of English at the University of Illinois at Chicago. He was educated at Harvard University, designed a course in 'Western Values' for the Harvard Business School and served in the Vietnam War as a paratrooper.

Throughout his life, he played tennis and taught tennis. He is a self-educated tennis player. Currently, he is a professional tennis coach in River Forest, Illinois.

Sloan drew on his military experiences for his first novel, War Games (Houghton, 1971), set during the Vietnam War, which won the 'New Writers Award' for the best novel of 1970-71 from the Great Lakes College Prize Committee.

He gained further recognition with his much-praised second novel, The Case History of Comrade V (Houghton, 1972). A third novel, The Last Cold War Cowboy (Morrow, 1987) came out in 1987.

He has also written non fiction works including a widely reviewed biography of controversial Polish-American and Jewish writer Jerzy Kosiński, published by Dutton in 1996 (Jerzy Kosinski: A Biography).

His short stories and articles include:

- "The Words of the Prophets", published in Amazing magazine in May 1988
- "Vietnam No Big Deal", published in the anthology Aftermath (ed. Donald Anderson, Holt, 1995)
- "Kosinski's War", published in The New Yorker, October 10, 1994
