= Maczka =

Mączka or Maczka is a surname of Polish-language origin, derived from mączka. Notable people with the surname include:

- Dominika Mączka, Polish track cyclist
- Józef Mączka (1888–1918), Polish soldier and poet
- Sister Melanie Maczka (born 1943), American nun
- Barbara March (born Barbara Jean Maczka; 1953), Canadian actress
