= The Voice of Poland season 4 =

The Voice of Poland
- Season 4
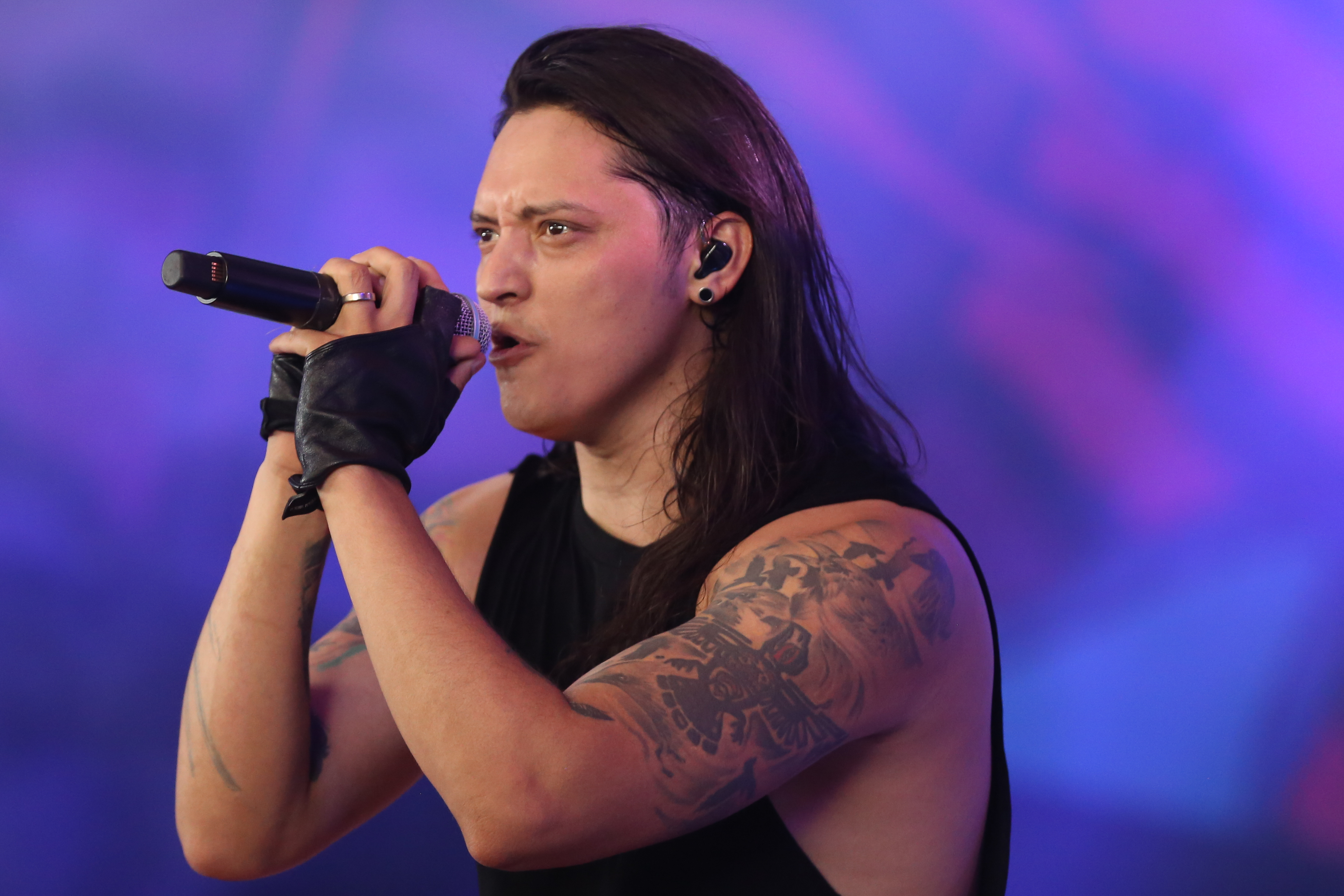
- Hosted by: Tomasz Kammel; Marika; Maciej Musiał (V Reporter)
- Judges: Marek Piekarczyk; Justyna Steczkowska; Tomson & Baron; Maria Sadowska
- Winner: Juan Carlos Cano
- Runner-up: Katarzyna Sawczuk

Release
- Original network: TVP2
- Original release: March 1 – May 24, 2014

Season chronology
- ← Previous; Season 3 Next → Season 5

The fourth season of The Voice of Poland began airing 1 March 2014 on TVP 2.

== Hosts and coaches ==
On January 7, 2014, Edyta Górniak announced she would be leaving the show in order to concentrate on her music career. On February 1, 2014, it was announced that Justyna Steczkowska, who served as a judge in the second season, will return to replace Edyta Górniak. The other judges will be Tomson & Baron, Maria Sadowska and Marek Piekarczyk. All hosts from the previous season will return.

Coaches and Hosts gallery

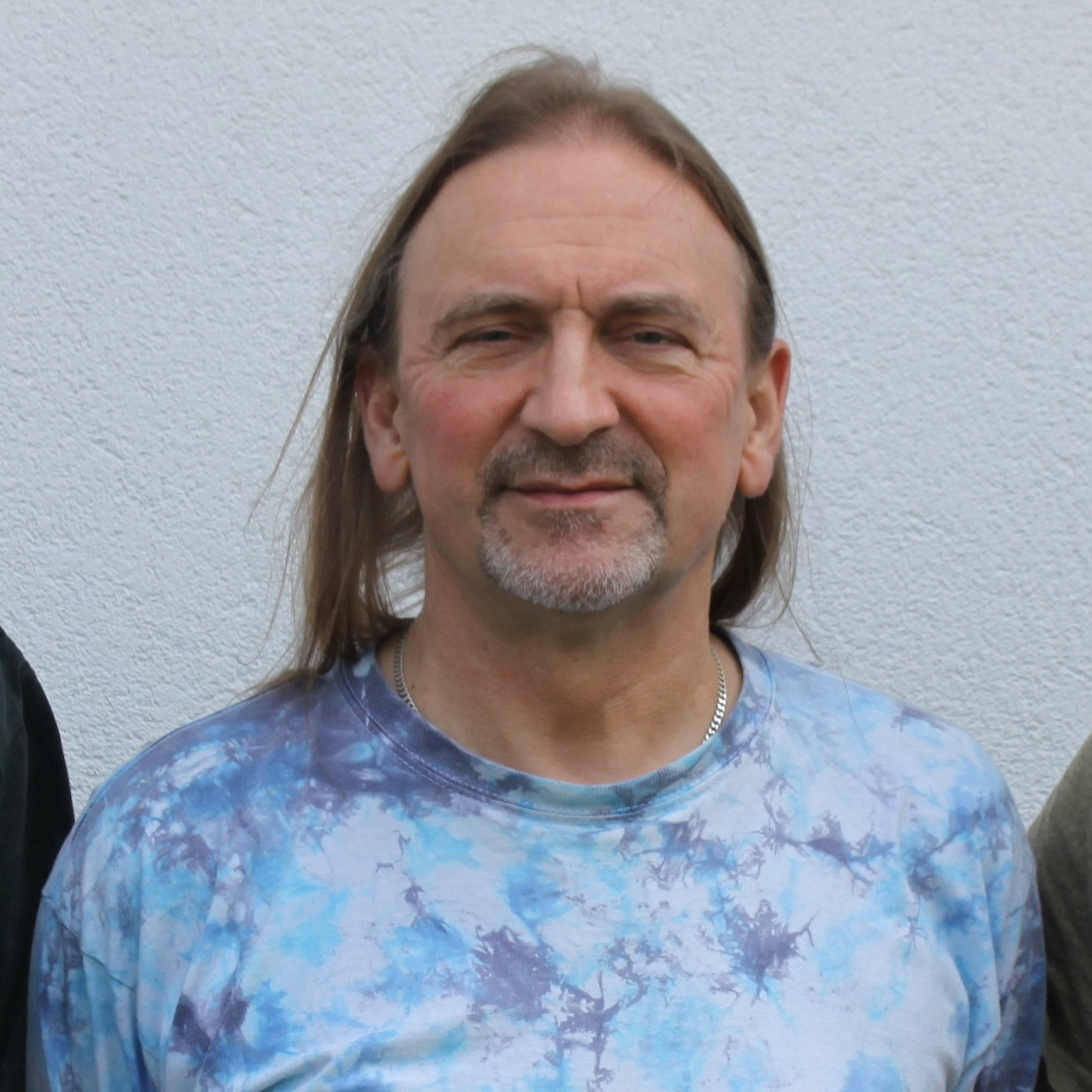
Marek Piekarczyk

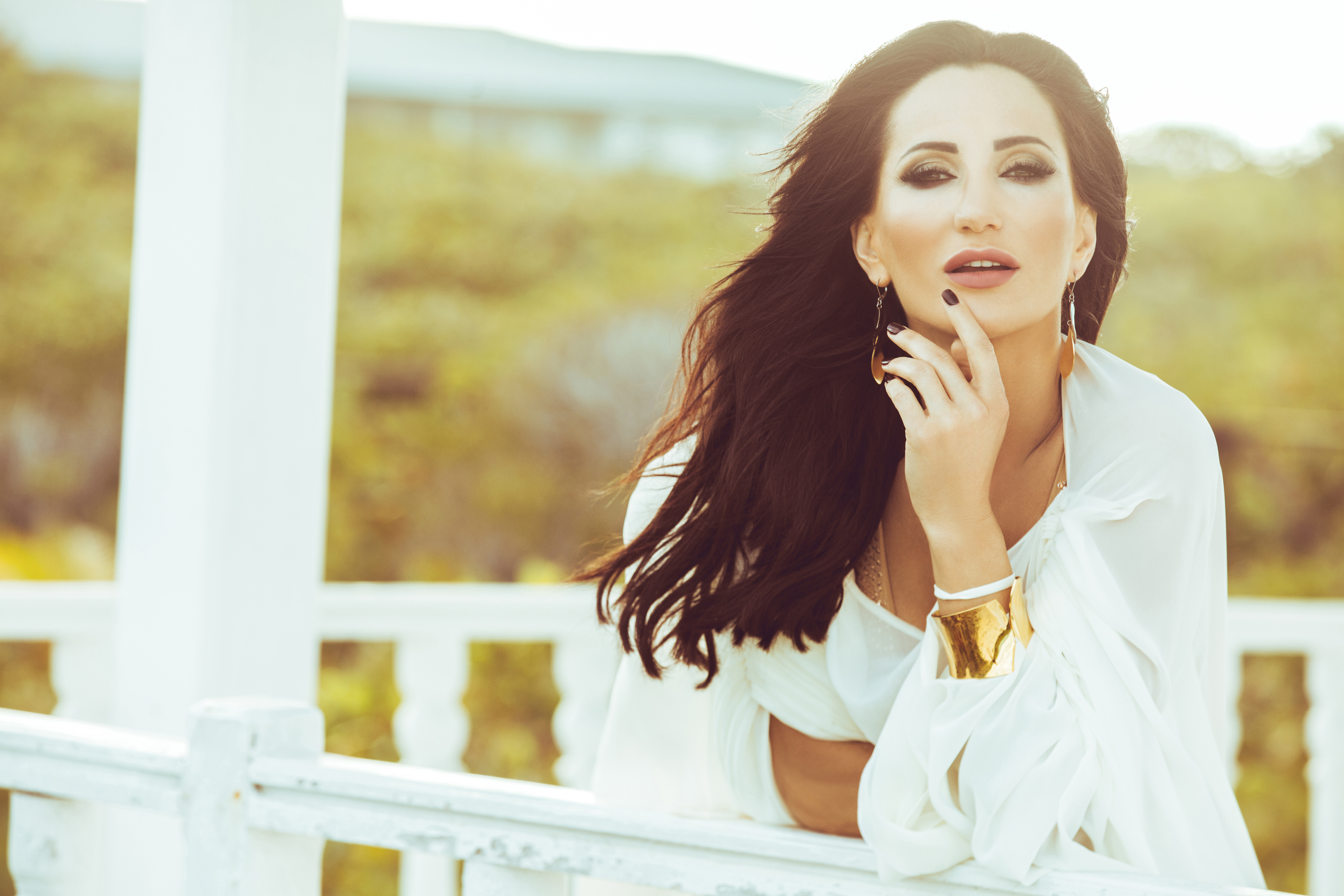
Justyna Steczkowska

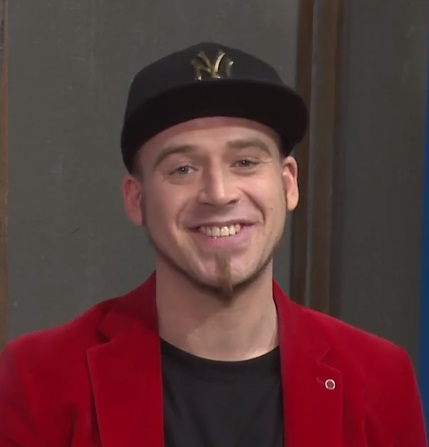
Tomasz Lach (duo)

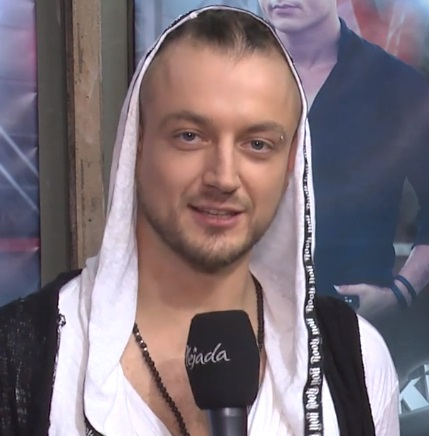
Aleksandr Milwiw-Baron (duo)

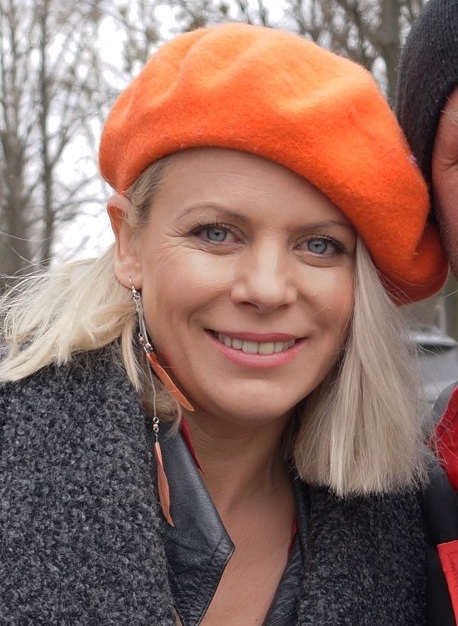
Maria Sadowska

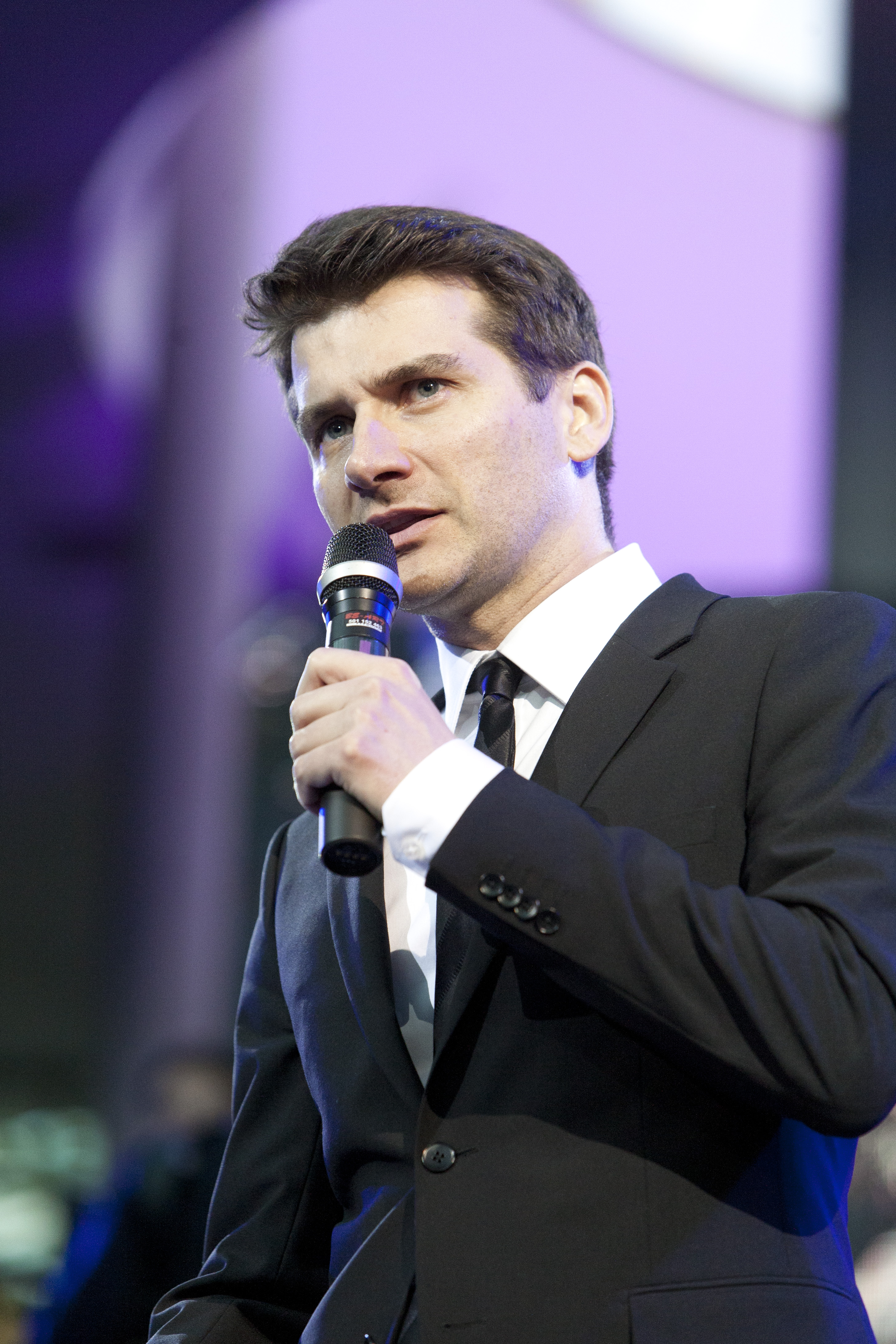
Tomasz Kammel

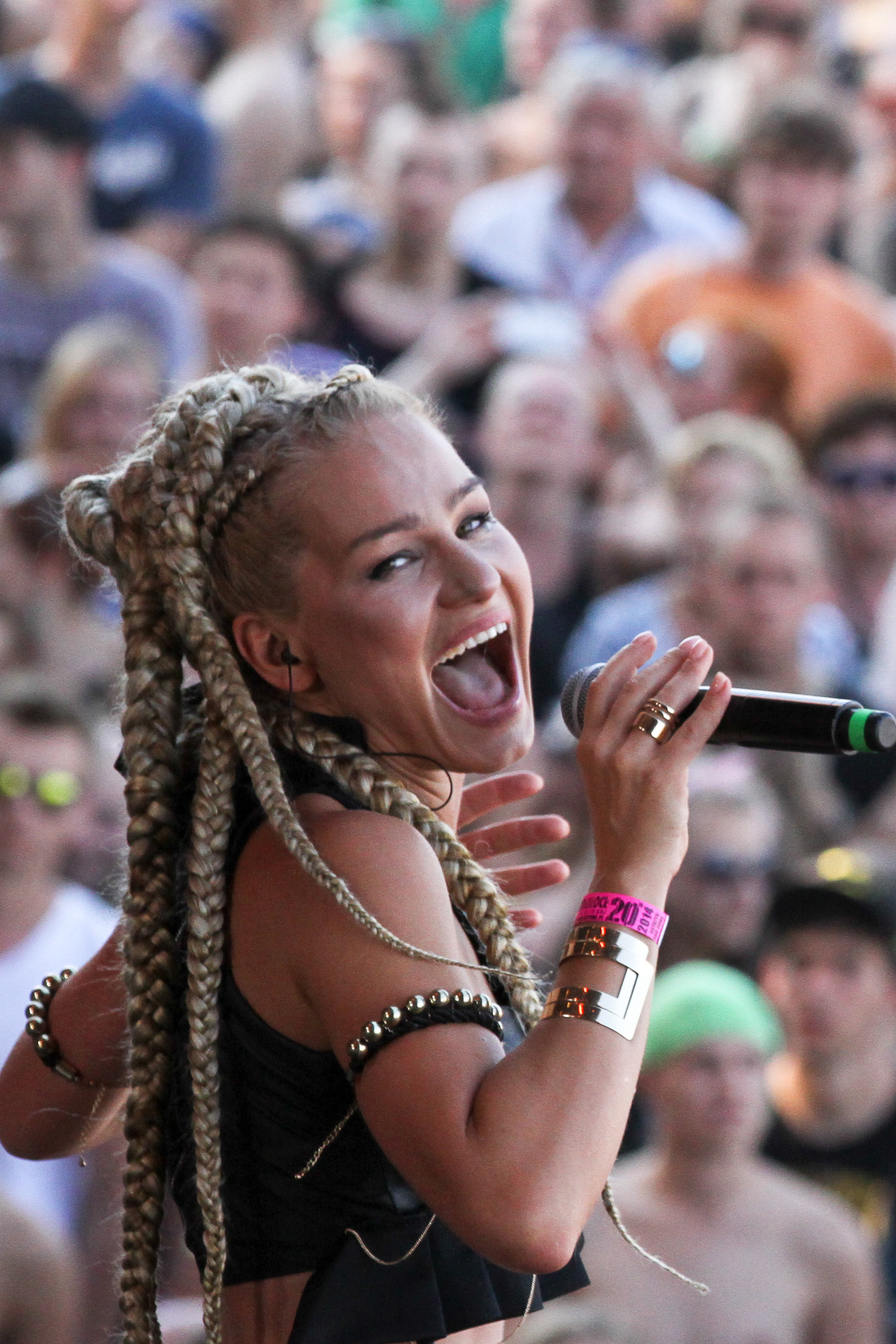
Marta "Marika" Kosakowska

== Auditions ==
Auditions took place on December 13 and 14, 2013 and January 10 and 11, 2014 in Warsaw.

== Teams ==
Color key

- Winner
- Runner-up
- Third place
- Fourth place
- Eliminated in the Semifinals
- Eliminated in the Quarterfinals
- Eliminated in the Live round
- Eliminated in the Knockout round
- Artist was stolen by another coach (Name is strikethroughed)
- Eliminated in the Battle rounds

Coaches	Top 48 artists				
Marek Piekarczyk					
Marek Piekarczyk	Aleksandra Węglewicz	Michał Karpacki	Dominika Kobiałka	Justyna Kunysz	Michał Kluska
Marek Piekarczyk	Marcin Nawrocki	Jerzy Sykut	Dorota Kuziela	~~Piotr Kowalczyk~~	~~Elżbieta Nagel~~
Marek Piekarczyk	~~Monika Pilarczyk~~	Jakub Siedlak	Igor Marinow	Damian Bartosiewicz	
Justyna Steczkowska					
Justyna Steczkowska	Katarzyna Sawczuk	Artur Kryvych	Michał Rudaś	Michał Szyc	Milena Kołodziejczyk
Justyna Steczkowska	Aleksandra Zachariasz	Kacper Leśniewski	Sławomir Ramian	~~Maja Gawłowska~~	Dawid & Sylwester
Justyna Steczkowska	Paulina Kopeć	Gabriela Panasiuk	Karolina Rumaczyk	Katarzyna Markiewicz (†)	
Tomson & Baron					
Tomson & Baron	Maja Gawłowska	Kamil Bijoś	Paulina Romaniuk	Wojciech Baranowski	Michał Chmielewski
Tomson & Baron	Monika Kręt	Klaudia Baca	Elżbieta Nagel	~~Aleksandra Węglewicz~~	~~Michał Szyc~~
Tomson & Baron	Klaudia Trzepizur	Mateusz Włodarczyk	Anna Lenart	Joanna Pszczoła	
Maria Sadowska					
Maria Sadowska	Juan Carlos Cano	Monika Pilarczyk	Marta Dryll	Sandra Mika	Katarzyna Kołodziejczyk
Maria Sadowska	Karolina Sumowska	Krzysztof Krysiński	Piotr Kowalczyk	~~Dorota Kuziela~~	~~Michał Rudaś~~
Maria Sadowska	Małgorzata Priebe	Angelika Kot	Paulina Szojer	Paulina Lulek	
Stolen artists are italicized.

== Blind auditions ==
The blind auditions were taped from February 12 to 15, 2014.

Color keys

✔	Coach hit his/her "I WANT YOU" button
	Artist defaulted to this coach's team
	Artist elected to join this coach's team
	Artist eliminated with no coach pressing his or her "I WANT YOU" button

=== Episode 1 (March 1, 2014) ===
The coaches performed "Tysiące głosów", polish version of "One Thousand Voices", at the start of the show.

Order	Artist	Age	Hometown	Song	Coach's and contestant's choices			
Order	Artist	Age	Hometown	Song	Marek	Justyna	Tomson & Baron	Maria
1	Michał Kluska	22	Jasło	"Hotel California"	✔	✔	✔	✔
2	Anna Lenart	18	Bielsko-Biała	"Sailing"	✔	✔	✔	✔
3	Robert Protasewicz	27	N/A	"Wild World"	—	—	—	—
4	Marta Dryll	20	Warsaw	"Here with Me"	✔	—	—	✔
5	Katarzyna Sawczuk	17	Biała Podlaska	"Titanium"	✔	✔	✔	✔

=== Episode 2 (March 1, 2014) ===
Order	Artist	Age	Hometown	Song	Coach's and contestant's choices			
Order	Artist	Age	Hometown	Song	Marek	Justyna	Tomson & Baron	Maria
1	Aleksandra Węglewicz	23	Siedlce	"Another Day in Paradise"	—	✔	✔	✔
2	Piotr Kowalczyk	18	Warsaw	"Sway"	✔	—	—	✔
3	Anna Deko	22	Nysa	"Małe rzeczy"	—	—	—	—
4	Karolina Rumaczyk	22	Słupsk	"Drzwi"	✔	✔	—	✔
5	Michał Chmielewski	25	N/A	"To Be with You"	—	—	✔	—
6	Juan Carlos Cano	31	Ciudad Cuauhtémoc, Mexico/Lublin	"Here I Go Again"	✔	✔	✔	✔

=== Episode 3 (March 8, 2014) ===
Order	Artist	Age	Hometown	Song	Coach's and contestant's choices			
Order	Artist	Age	Hometown	Song	Marek	Justyna	Tomson & Baron	Maria
1	Joanna Pszczoła	33	N/A	"No More Drama"	✔	✔	✔	✔
2	Marcin Piątek	25	N/A	"Czerwony jak cegła"	—	—	—	—
3	Marcin Nawrocki	21	N/A	"Please Forgive Me"	✔	—	✔	—
4	Sandra Mika	17	Kraków	"The Time Is Now"	—	✔	✔	✔
5	Dawid Litwiński & Sylwester Ruszkowski	19 & 28	Łomża/Łęczyca	"More Than Words"	✔	✔	—	—
6	Artur Kryvych	18	Kremenchuk, Ukraine/Kraków	"Creep"	✔	✔	✔	✔

=== Episode 4 (March 8, 2014) ===
Order	Artist	Age	Hometown	Song	Coach's and contestant's choices			
Order	Artist	Age	Hometown	Song	Marek	Justyna	Tomson & Baron	Maria
1	Dorota Kuziela	29	Wrocław	"To Be with You"	—	✔	—	✔
2	Aneta Kowalewska	24	Białystok	"Rescue Me"	—	—	—	—
3	Kamil Bijoś	22	Rzeszów	"Nice"	✔	✔	✔	✔
4	Inga Gozdur	22	Kielce	"Jak rzecz"	—	—	—	—
5	Mariusz Myrcha	22	Kwidzyn	"Wherever You Will Go"	—	—	—	—
6	Marta Szramowska	18	Pelplin	"Zazdrość"	—	—	—	—
7	Igor Marinow	29	N/A	"Woman"	✔	—	—	✔
8	Jerzy Sykut	42	Wrocław	"It's a Heartache"	✔	—	—	—
9	Katarzyna Markiewicz (†)	38	N/A	"Dreamer"	—	✔	—	—

=== Episode 5 (March 15, 2014) ===
Order	Artist	Age	Hometown	Song	Coach's and contestant's choices			
Order	Artist	Age	Hometown	Song	Marek	Justyna	Tomson & Baron	Maria
1	Małgorzata Priebe	17	N/A	"The Time Is Now"	✔	—	✔	✔
2	Monika Kręt	27	N/A	"Radioactive"	✔	✔	✔	✔
3	Damian Bartosiewicz	18	Brwinów	"Wish You Were Here"	✔	—	—	—
4	Kamila Markuszewska	23	N/A	"Pocałuj noc"	—	—	—	—
5	Alicja Kozłowska	21	N/A	"Pocałuj noc"	—	—	—	—
6	Monika Pilarczyk	29	Dębica/Kraków	"Livin' on a Prayer"	✔	✔	✔	✔
7	Angelika Kot	20	Wadowice	"Where Is My Mind?"	—	—	—	✔
8	Elżbieta Nagel	16	Szczuczyn	"The Passenger"	✔	✔	—	✔

=== Episode 6 (March 15, 2014) ===
Order	Artist	Age	Hometown	Song	Coach's and contestant's choices			
Order	Artist	Age	Hometown	Song	Marek	Justyna	Tomson & Baron	Maria
1	Klaudia Trzepizur	21	Częstochowa	"It's a Heartache"	—	—	✔	✔
2	Gabriela Panasiuk	16	N/A	"Irreplaceable"	✔	✔	—	✔
3	Michał Rudaś	32	Warsaw	"Siódmy rok"	—	—	✔	✔
4	Jagoda Uniewicz	25	Poznań	"Samba przed rozstaniem"	—	—	—	—
5	Michał Szyc	24	Kalisz	"A Whiter Shade of Pale"	✔	✔	✔	—
6	Maja Gawłowska	17	Ostrów Wielkopolski	"Summertime"	✔	✔	✔	✔
7	Vitaly Voronko	23	N/A	"Bałkanica"	—	—	—	—

=== Episode 7 (March 22, 2014) ===
Order	Artist	Age	Hometown	Song	Coach's and contestant's choices			
Order	Artist	Age	Hometown	Song	Marek	Justyna	Tomson & Baron	Maria
1	Paulina Lulek	26	Prudnik	"All I Wanna Do"	—	✔	—	✔
2	Tobiasz Pietrzyk	19	Ostrów Wielkopolski	"To co dobre, to co lepsze"	—	—	—	—
3	Krzysztof Krysiński	25	Pruszków	"Dni, których nie znamy"	✔	✔	—	✔
4	Dominika Naborowska	29	N/A	"Fleciki"	—	—	—	—
5	Marcelina Woźna	24	Wschowa	"Titanium"	—	—	—	—
6	Sławomir Ramian	29	Tarnów	"Angels"	—	✔	—	—
7	Jakub Siedlak	20	Chorzów	"Behind Blue Eyes"	✔	✔	—	—
8	Paulina Kopeć	21	Kotowa Wola	"Can't Help Falling in Love"	✔	✔	✔	✔

=== Episode 8 (March 22, 2014) ===
Order	Artist	Age	Hometown	Song	Coach's and contestant's choices			
Order	Artist	Age	Hometown	Song	Marek	Justyna	Tomson & Baron	Maria
1	Milena Kołodziejczyk	21	N/A	"Streets of Philadelphia"	✔	✔	✔	—
2	Piotr Jacyno	28	Przemyśl	"San Francisco"	—	—	—	—
3	Nicole Kulesza	21	Złotów	"Sweet Nothing"	—	—	—	—
4	Adam Kalinowski	19	N/A	"Maybe Tomorrow"	—	—	—	—
5	Klaudia Baca	23	N/A	"Varsovie"	—	✔	✔	✔
6	Kinga Kowalkowska	16	N/A	"Rescue Me"	—	—	—	—
7	Justyna Kunysz	23	Przemyśl	"Melodia ulotna"	✔	✔	—	✔
8	Małgorzata Boć	32	Rzeszów	"Sway"	—	—	—	—
9	Wojciech Baranowski	22	Piotrków Trybunalski	"Here Comes the Sun"	✔	—	✔	✔

=== Episode 9 (March 29, 2014) ===
Order	Artist	Age	Hometown	Song	Coach's and contestant's choices			
Order	Artist	Age	Hometown	Song	Marek	Justyna	Tomson & Baron	Maria
1	Katarzyna Kołodziejczyk	35	N/A	"Autumn Leaves"	—	✔	—	✔
2	Wojciech Urban	35	Ruda Śląska	"Come as You Are"	—	—	—	—
3	Michał Karpacki	29	Łódź	"Streets of Philadelphia"	✔	—	—	—
4	Katarzyna Mietelska	21	N/A	"Kasztany"	—	—	—	—
5	Karolina Michalik	27	N/A	"Maybe Tomorrow"	—	—	—	—
6	Piotr Dejnak	22	N/A	"Losing My Religion"	—	—	—	—
7	Kacper Leśniewski	31	Rzeszów	"Wicked Game"	✔	✔	—	✔
8	Paulina Szojer	27	Rybnik	"Treasure"	—	✔	—	✔
9	Mateusz Włodarczyk	21	Tomaszów Mazowiecki	"Troublemaker"	—	✔	✔	✔

=== Episode 10 (March 29, 2014) ===
Order	Artist	Age	Hometown	Song	Coach's and contestant's choices			
Order	Artist	Age	Hometown	Song	Marek	Justyna	Tomson & Baron	Maria
1	Aleksandra Zachariasz	20	Kielce	"No More Drama"	—	✔	—	✔
2	Karolina Sumowska	30	Malbork	"Please Forgive Me"	✔	✔	—	✔
3	Oliwia Drożdżyk	17	Konin	"Let Her Go"	—	—	—	—
4	Paulina Romaniuk	21	N/A	"Lifted"	—	✔	✔	✔
5	Karolina Górecka	19	N/A	"Miałeś być"	—	—	—	—
6	Jakub Sielski	19	N/A	"Dance Me to the End of Love"	—	—	—	—
7	Agnieszka Wiechnik	30	Janów Lubelski	"Ta sama chwila"	—	—	—	—
8	Dominika Kobiałka	29	Rzeszów	"Drzwi"	✔	—	✔	✔

== The Battle rounds ==
The Battle rounds were taped from March 17 to 19, 2014.

Katarzyna Markiewicz could not arrive to take part in Battle rounds due to health problems. On March 23, 2014, she died at the age of 38, due to cervical cancer with multiple metastases. Sławomir Ramian, who would be her battle partner, was put straight through and performed "Moja i twoja nadzieja" as a tribute.

Color keys

Artist won the Battle and advances to the Knockouts
Artist lost the Battle but was stolen by another coach and advances to the Knockouts
Artist lost the Battle and was eliminated

=== Episode 11 (April 5, 2014) ===
Coach	Order	Winner	Song	Loser	'Steal' result			
Coach	Order	Winner	Song	Loser	Marek	Justyna	Tomson & Baron	Maria
Maria Sadowska	1	Marta Dryll	"Wish I Didn't Miss You"	Paulina Lulek	—	—	—	—N/a
Marek Piekarczyk	2	Michał Karpacki	"Personal Jesus"	Piotr Kowalczyk	—N/a	—	—	✔
Tomson & Baron	3	Klaudia Baca	"I'm Yours"	Anna Lenart	—	—	—N/a	—
Justyna Steczkowska	4	Kacper Leśniewski	"Summer Wine"	Karolina Rumaczyk	—	—N/a	—	—
Marek Piekarczyk	5	Michał Kluska	"Ona jest ze snu"	Igor Marinow	—N/a	—	—	—
Tomson & Baron	6	Kamil Bijoś	"Moves like Jagger"	Aleksandra Węglewicz	✔	—	—N/a	—
Maria Sadowska	7	Juan Carlos Cano	"Cryin'"	Michał Rudaś	—	✔	—	—N/a
Justyna Steczkowska	8	Sławomir Ramian	"Moja i twoja nadzieja"	Katarzyna Markiewicz	—N/a	—N/a	—N/a	—N/a

=== Episode 12 (April 12, 2014) ===
Coach	Order	Winner	Song	Loser	'Steal' result			
Coach	Order	Winner	Song	Loser	Marek	Justyna	Tomson & Baron	Maria
Justyna Steczkowska	1	Aleksandra Zachariasz	"Can't Remember to Forget You"	Gabriela Panasiuk	—	—N/a	—	—
Maria Sadowska	2	Karolina Sumowska	"Hey Ya!"/"We Found Love"	Paulina Szojer	—	—	—	—N/a
Tomson & Baron	3	Monika Kręt	"Smooth"	Mateusz Włodarczyk	—	—	—N/a	—
Marek Piekarczyk	4	Justyna Kunysz	"Jeżozwierz"	Jakub Siedlak	—N/a	—	—	—
Tomson & Baron	5	Michał Chmielewski	"Wild Horses"	Klaudia Trzepizur	—	—	—N/a	—
Maria Sadowska	6	Katarzyna Kołodziejczyk	"Moje serce to jest muzyk"	Angelika Kot	—	—	—	—N/a
Justyna Steczkowska	7	Artur Kryvych	"I Still Haven't Found What I'm Looking For"	Paulina Kopeć	—	—N/a	—	—
Marek Piekarczyk	8	Dominika Kobiałka	"Born to Be Wild"	Monika Pilarczyk	—N/a	—	—	✔

=== Episode 13 (April 19, 2014) ===
Coach	Order	Winner	Song	Loser	'Steal' result			
Coach	Order	Winner	Song	Loser	Marek	Justyna	Tomson & Baron	Maria
Maria Sadowska	1	Sandra Mika	"Supermenka"	Małgorzata Priebe	—	—	—	—N/a
Tomson & Baron	2	Wojciech Baranowski	"Numb"	Michał Szyc	✔	✔	—N/a	—N/a
Justyna Steczkowska	3	Milena Kołodziejczyk	"You're the One That I Want"	Dawid & Sylwester	—	—N/a	—	—N/a
Marek Piekarczyk	4	Jerzy Sykut	"Płonąca stodoła"	Elżbieta Nagel	—N/a	—N/a	✔	—N/a
Maria Sadowska	5	Krzysztof Krysiński	"What I Am"	Dorota Kuziela	✔	—N/a	—	—N/a
Tomson & Baron	6	Paulina Romaniuk	"Hot Right Now"	Joanna Pszczoła	—N/a	—N/a	—N/a	—N/a
Marek Piekarczyk	7	Michał Nawrocki	"Na falochronie"	Damian Bartosiewicz	—N/a	—N/a	—	—N/a
Justyna Steczkowska	8	Katarzyna Sawczuk	"Angel"	Maja Gawłowska	—N/a	—N/a	✔	—N/a

== The Knockouts ==
Before each knockout round the coach chooses two artists from their team to get a "fast pass" to the live shows, the remaining six artists from that team are then split up into two groups of three. At the end of each knockout round the coach then decides out of the three artists who wins, and therefore makes up their four artists to take to the live shows.

=== Episode 14 (April 26, 2014) ===
Color keys

Artist won the Knockouts and advances to the Live shows
Artist lost the Knockouts and was eliminated

Order	Coach	Song	Winner	Loser	Song
1	Tomson & Baron	"Wildest Moments"	Maja Gawłowska	Elżbieta Nagel	"Szare miraże"
1	Tomson & Baron	"Wildest Moments"	Maja Gawłowska	Klaudia Baca	"Nigdy więcej nie tańcz ze mną"
2	Tomson & Baron	"1000 metrów nad ziemią"	Kamil Bijoś	Monika Kręt	"Don't You Remember"
2	Tomson & Baron	"1000 metrów nad ziemią"	Kamil Bijoś	Michał Chmielewski	"Radioactive"
3	Justyna Steczkowska	"Trouble"	Artur Kryvych	Sławomir Ramian	"You Get What You Give"
3	Justyna Steczkowska	"Trouble"	Artur Kryvych	Kacper Leśniewski	"Ho Hey"
4	Justyna Steczkowska	"Chodź, przytul, przebacz"	Michał Szyc	Aleksandra Zachariasz	"Troublemaker"
4	Justyna Steczkowska	"Chodź, przytul, przebacz"	Michał Szyc	Milena Kołodziejczyk	"Another Day"
5	Marek Piekarczyk	"A Song for You"	Michał Karpacki	Dorota Kuziela	"Son of a Preacher Man"
5	Marek Piekarczyk	"A Song for You"	Michał Karpacki	Jerzy Sykut	"Na jednej z dzikich plaż"
6	Marek Piekarczyk	"Irreplaceable"	Aleksandra Węglewicz	Marcin Nawrocki	"Czerwony jak cegła"
6	Marek Piekarczyk	"Irreplaceable"	Aleksandra Węglewicz	Michał Kluska	"Drzwi"
7	Maria Sadowska	"Just a Girl"	Monika Pilarczyk	Piotr Kowalczyk	"Aleja gwiazd"
7	Maria Sadowska	"Just a Girl"	Monika Pilarczyk	Krzysztof Krysiński	"Wherever You Will Go"
8	Maria Sadowska	"Next to Me"	Marta Dryll	Karolina Sumowska	"Melodia ulotna"
8	Maria Sadowska	"Next to Me"	Marta Dryll	Katarzyna Kołodziejczyk	"Pamiętasz, była jesień"

== Live Shows ==
Color keys

Artist was saved by Public's vote
Artist was saved by his/her coach
Artist was eliminated

=== Episode 15 (May 3, 2014) ===
Order	Coach	Artist	Song	Result
1	Maria Sadowska	Sandra Mika	"Spectrum (Say My Name)"	Eliminated
2	Maria Sadowska	Marta Dryll	"Empire State of Mind"	Maria's choice
3	Maria Sadowska	Monika Pilarczyk	"Unconditionally"	Public's vote
4	Maria Sadowska	Juan Carlos Cano	"Break On Through (To the Other Side)"	Public's vote
5	Marek Piekarczyk	Aleksandra Węglewicz	"Na szczycie"	Public's vote
6	Marek Piekarczyk	Michał Karpacki	"Nigdy więcej"	Public's vote
7	Marek Piekarczyk	Justyna Kunysz	"Ślepa miłość"	Eliminated
8	Marek Piekarczyk	Dominika Kobiałka	"Napraw"	Marek's choice
9	Tomson & Baron	Maja Gawłowska	"Byłam różą"	Public's vote
10	Tomson & Baron	Kamil Bijoś	"Locked Out of Heaven"	Tomson & Baron's choice
11	Tomson & Baron	Wojciech Baranowski	"Use Somebody"	Eliminated
12	Tomson & Baron	Paulina Romaniuk	"Crazy"	Public's vote
13	Justyna Steczkowska	Artur Kryvych	"I See Fire"	Public's vote
14	Justyna Steczkowska	Michał Szyc	"Peron"	Eliminated
15	Justyna Steczkowska	Michał Rudaś	"Jai Ho"	Justyna's choice
16	Justyna Steczkowska	Katarzyna Sawczuk	"Adagio"	Public's vote

Non-competition performances
Order	Performers	Song
1	Team Maria	"Life is a Beat"
2	Team Marek	"Mass media"
3	Liber & Mateusz Grędziński	"Czarne chmury"
4	Team Tomson & Baron	"Jak nie my to kto"
5	Team Justyna	"Za karę"

=== Episode 16 (May 10, 2014) ===
Order	Coach	Artist	Song	Result
1	Marek Piekarczyk	Michał Karpacki	"Niedziela będzie dla nas"	Public's vote
2	Marek Piekarczyk	Aleksandra Węglewicz	"Jezioro szczęścia"	Marek's choice
3	Marek Piekarczyk	Dominika Kobiałka	"The Boys Are Back in Town"	Eliminated
4	Justyna Steczkowska	Michał Rudaś	"Hello"	Eliminated
5	Justyna Steczkowska	Artur Kryvych	"Join Me in Death"	Public's vote
6	Justyna Steczkowska	Katarzyna Sawczuk	"List"	Justyna's choice
7	Maria Sadowska	Marta Dryll	"Free"	Eliminated
8	Maria Sadowska	Juan Carlos Cano	"Nadzieja"	Public's vote
9	Maria Sadowska	Monika Pilarczyk	"Na językach"	Maria's choice
10	Tomson & Baron	Paulina Romaniuk	"Unfaithful"	Eliminated
11	Tomson & Baron	Kamil Bijoś	"Fragile"	Tomson & Baron's choice
12	Tomson & Baron	Maja Gawłowska	"Purple Rain"	Public's vote

Non-competition performances
Order	Performers	Song
1	Marika	"She Wolf (Falling to Pieces)"
2	Marek Piekarczyk	"Czy pamiętasz?"
3	Justyna Steczkowska	"Terra"
4	Vitalij Voronko	"Rolling in the Deep"
5	Maria Sadowska	"Warsaw"
6	Afromental	"Mental House"

=== Semifinal (May 17, 2014) ===
Coach	Artist	Order	Solo song	Order	Duet	Order	Finalist's song	Summary of points			Result
Coach	Artist	Order	Solo song	Order	Duet	Order	Finalist's song	Coach's	Public's	Total	Result
Justyna Steczkowska	Katarzyna Sawczuk	1	"Black Velvet"	3	"Someone new"	4	"Angel"	70.00	43.86	113.86	Safe
Justyna Steczkowska	Artur Kryvych	2	"Długość dźwięku samotności"	3	"Someone new"	Already eliminated		30.00	56.14	86.14	Eliminated
Tomson & Baron	Kamil Bijoś	5	"Man in the Mirror"	7	"Unforgettable"	Already eliminated		52.00	41.92	93.92	Eliminated
Tomson & Baron	Maja Gawłowska	6	"Over the Rainbow"	7	"Unforgettable"	8	"Byłam różą"	48.00	58.08	106.08	Safe
Marek Piekarczyk	Aleksandra Węglewicz	9	"I Want to Know What Love Is"	11	"Prócz Ciebie nic"	12	"Another Day in Paradise"	60.00	46.01	106.01	Safe
Marek Piekarczyk	Michał Karpacki	10	"Cheating"	11	"Prócz Ciebie nic"	Already eliminated		40.00	53.99	93.99	Eliminated
Maria Sadowska	Monika Pilarczyk	13	"Ready to Go"	15	"Józek, nie daruję Ci tej nocy"	Already eliminated		57.00	16.39	73.39	Eliminated
Maria Sadowska	Juan Carlos Cano	14	"Hold the Line"	15	"Józek, nie daruję Ci tej nocy"	16	"Here I Go Again"	43.00	83.61	126.61	Safe

Non-competition performances
Order	Performers	Song
1	Monika Urlik	"Nie wie nikt"
2	Arkadiusz Kłusowski	"Podpalimy miasta"

=== Final (May 24, 2014) ===
Coach	Artist	Order	Solo song	Order	Duet song	Duet with	Order	Duet with coach	Order	Finalist's song	Result
Marek Piekarczyk	Aleksandra Węglewicz	1	"Magiczne słowa"	5	"Nie zapomnij"	Edyta Górniak	9	"Nie przejdziemy do historii"	Already eliminated		Fourth place
Tomson & Baron	Maja Gawłowska	6	"Against All Odds (Take a Look at Me Now)"	2	"Będę z Tobą"	LemON	11	"Don't Give Up"	Already eliminated		Third place
Maria Sadowska	Juan Carlos Cano	3	"Paradise City"	7	"You Shook Me All Night Long"	Titus	12	"Bad"	14	"Falling"	Winner
Justyna Steczkowska	Kasia Sawczuk	8	"The Power of Love"	4	"Nie więcej"	Katarzyna Nosowska	10	"May It Be"	13	"Outer Space"	Runner-up

Non-competition performances
Order	Performers	Song
1	Top 4 finalists	"Let It Be"
2	Edyta Górniak	"Your High"
3	Top 16 finalists and Piotr Kowalczyk	"Happy"
4	Mateusz Ziółko	"Najdalej"

== Results summary of live shows ==
Color keys
Artist's info

- Artist from Team Marek
- Artist from Team Justyna
- Artist from Team Tomson & Baron
- Artist from Team Maria

Result details

- Artist was proclaimed as winner
- Artist was proclaimed as runner-up
- Artist was proclaimed as third place
- Artist was proclaimed as fourth place
- Artist advanced to the finals
- Artist was saved by his/her coach
- Artist was saved by the public
- Artist received the fewest accumulated total points and was eliminated
- Artist received the fewest of the public's vote and was eliminated

Live show results per week
Artist	Week 1	Week 2	Week 3	Final
Juan Carlos Cano	Safe	Safe	Advanced	Winner
Katarzyna Sawczuk	Safe	Safe	Advanced	Runner-up
Maja Gawłowska	Safe	Safe	Advanced	3rd place
Aleksandra Węglewicz	Safe	Safe	Advanced	4th place
Artur Kryvych	Safe	Safe	Eliminated	Eliminated (Week 3)
Kamil Bijoś	Safe	Safe	Eliminated	Eliminated (Week 3)
Michał Karpacki	Safe	Safe	Eliminated	Eliminated (Week 3)
Monika Pilarczyk	Safe	Safe	Eliminated	Eliminated (Week 3)
Dominika Kobiałka	Safe	Eliminated	Eliminated (Week 2)	
Marta Dryll	Safe	Eliminated	Eliminated (Week 2)	
Michał Rudaś	Safe	Eliminated	Eliminated (Week 2)	
Paulina Romaniuk	Safe	Eliminated	Eliminated (Week 2)	
Justyna Kunysz	Eliminated	Eliminated (Week 1)		
Michał Szyc	Eliminated	Eliminated (Week 1)		
Sandra Mika	Eliminated	Eliminated (Week 1)		
Wojciech Baranowski	Eliminated	Eliminated (Week 1)		

== Artists' appearances on earlier talent shows ==
- Marta Dryll was a contestant on the first season of Bitwa na głosy.
- Katarzyna Sawczuk appeared on the season two of Mam talent!.
- Anna Deko appeared on the second season of Bitwa na głosy. Later she was a contestant on the third season of X Factor. She was eliminated at the Bootcamp stage.
- Michał Chmielewski sang in the blind auditions of season two of The Voice of Poland and failed to make a team, but was able to turn a chair this season.
- Kinga Kowalkowska, Igor Marinow and Klaudia Trzepizur competed on Must Be the Music. Tylko muzyka – seasons one, two and five respectively.
- Monika Pilarczyk auditioned for Mam talent! – season four.
- Tobiasz Pietrzyk sang in the blind auditions of season two of The Voice of Poland, but failed to turn any chairs.
- Michał Karpacki was among the Top 10 finalists on Idol – season three.

== Ratings ==
Summary of episode ratings
Episode	Date	Duration (minutes)^1	Official rating (millions)	Share (%)	Share 16–49 (%)
Blind Auditions 1&2	March 1	120	2 374 917	15,30%	13,81%
Blind Auditions 3&4	March 8	120	2 568 066		
Blind Auditions 5&6	March 15	120	2 462 056		
Blind Auditions 7&8	March 22	120	2 314 627		
Blind Auditions 9&10	March 29	120	2 614 320		
Battle round 1	April 5	120	2 637 208		
Battle round 2	April 12	120	2 423 523		
Battle round 3	April 19	120	1 953 627		
Knockout	April 26	120	1 782 615		
Live 1	3 May	130	2 043 266		
Live 2	10 May	115	1 522 026		
Live 3	17 May	115	1 811 625		
Final	24 May	130	1 971 255		
Series average	–	–	2 153 332	14.41%	13.69%

^{1} Includes advert breaks
