= C. Gregory Stapko =

American painter

Casimir Gregory Stapko (March 14, 1913 – March 12, 2006) was a portrait painter and copyist. Many of his copies are from paintings in The National Gallery of Art.

He has his paintings in the White House, Blair House, Arlington House, U.S. embassies and government agencies, as well as the walls of businesses and private homes around the world.

Casimir Gregory Stapko was born in Milwaukee to Polish immigrants. At 13, he was apprenticed to various church painters, who taught him to restore frescoes, imitate marble and wood, paint murals and apply gold leaf. He moved to Washington at the urging of Polish artist Eliasz Kanarek, who operated a studio and had prominent connections that would lead to portrait commissions for his protege, Stapko.

In addition to portrait painting and copying assignments, Stapko restored damaged paintings, taught oil painting, did gold-leaf work for churches, built furniture and crafted copies of old frames to go with copied paintings. He also copied paintings for publishers of illustrated art books.

Stapko's copying genius led to a new gallery rule requiring that all copies had to be done at least two inches smaller than the original and labeled on the back with paint that would stand out under X-rays long after the color had faded. It also led to Stapko's years-long association with the National Gallery of Art.

Stapko's wife, Isabel Wetherill Stapko, a painter and textile artist, died in 1998.

His granddaughter Kathryn Stapko is a designer and visual artist that is known for her experimental typography.
