= Basia Giewont =

Polish singer and criminologist

- Born: Barbara Gąsienica-Giewont; November 18, 1991 (age 34); Zakopane, Poland
- Origin: Zakopane, Poland
- Genres: Ethno-pop, Folktronica
- Occupations: Singer; actress; criminologist
- Instrument: Vocals
- Years active: 2011–present

Barbara Gąsienica-Giewont (born November 18, 1991), professionally known as Basia Giewont, is a Polish singer, actress and criminologist. She is a certified opera singer.

== Education ==
Gąsienica-Giewont was educated in the Zakopane State High School of Art, 10th Secondary School in Krakow, Władysław Żeleński State Secondary Music School and at the Academy of Music in Krakow. At the State Secondary Music School, she played violin as her entrance exam instrument. She also studied criminology at the University of Warsaw.

== Career ==
In 2011, Gąsienica-Giewont worked with Andrzej Poniedzielski on the musical project Wywar z przywar. In 2012, she won the main prize in the 4th International Festival of French Song in Kraków. In the same year, she performed in the choir led by Piotr Rubik in the third edition of entertainment program Battle of Voices on TVP2. In 2013, she was a contestant on The Voice of Poland series 3.

Gąsienica-Giewont wrote her thesis in 2018, titled "Zabójstwo w Kredyt Banku – study case", about the Kredyt Banku case.

In 2020, she released a self titled debut album Basia Giewont. In the same year she participated in Poland's National final in the Eurovision Song Contest 2020. She acted in "Aida" at the Roma Musical Theatre and in "Archimedes Bathtub" at the Warsaw Capitol Theatre.

In 2022, she won the Radio Trójka Award for Most Interesting Newcomer. During the 59th National Festival of Polish Song, Basia sang a song titled "Nie być." The same year she released album Na tęgi mróz.... In 2023, she recorded a track titled "Bidula". The song was used as a campaign for anti-violence laws in Zakopane.

Basia released her album Taterki in 2024. In 2025, she released an album titled Szeptucha. The album was inspired by ancient spells, rituals, and symbols. In March 2026, she took part in polish contest Finał krajowych kwalifikacji with her song "Zimna Woda". She placed third in the final. In May 2026, Gąsienica-Giewont released her single "Dym". "Dym" addressed themes of nicotine addiction and smoking. She performed the Cyzste Tatry closing concert alongside Sara James on 29 August.

== Artistry ==
Gąsienica-Giewont has named Ewa Demarczyk, Grzegorz Turnau, Kate Bush and the Ukrainian bands Onuka and Go_A amongst her musical inspirations. She has stated that her music takes pro-social themes from her work in criminology. Her music blends Folktronica, ethno-pop, Polish highland music and sounds of Podhale.

== Discography ==
=== Albums ===
- Basia Giewont (2020)
- Na tęgi mróz... (2022)
- Takterki (2024)
- Szeptucha (2025)

=== Singles ===
- "Zimna Woda" (2025)
- "Dym" (2026)

== Filmography ==
=== TV ===
- Battle of Voices (2012)
- The Voice of Poland series 3 (2013)
- Finał krajowych kwalifikacji (2026)
