= Agatówka, Stalowa Wola County =

Agatówka
- Village
- Location within Poland
- Coordinates: 50°36′31″N 22°0′41″E
- Country: Poland
- Voivodeship: Subcarpathian
- County: Stalowa Wola
- Gmina: Zaleszany
- Population: 359

Agatówka [aɡaˈtufka] is a village in the administrative district of Gmina Zaleszany, within Stalowa Wola County, Subcarpathian Voivodeship, in south-eastern Poland.
