= Wólka Turebska =

- Village
- Location within Poland
- Coordinates: 50°39′N 21°59′E
- Country: Poland
- Voivodeship: Subcarpathian
- County: Stalowa Wola
- Gmina: Zaleszany

Wólka Turebska [ˈvulka tuˈrɛpska] is a village in the administrative district of Gmina Zaleszany, within Stalowa Wola County, Subcarpathian Voivodeship, in south-eastern Poland.
