= Majdan Zbydniowski =

- Village
- Location within Poland
- Coordinates: 50°39′N 21°58′E
- Country: Poland
- Voivodeship: Subcarpathian
- County: Stalowa Wola
- Gmina: Zaleszany
- Website: http://www.adamchciuk.republika.pl/

Majdan Zbydniowski (Polish pronunciation: [ˈmajdan zbɨdˈɲɔfskʲi]) is a village in the administrative district of Gmina Zaleszany, within Stalowa Wola County, Subcarpathian Voivodeship, in south-eastern Poland.
