= Obojnia =

- Village
- Location within Poland
- Coordinates: 50°36′26″N 21°59′01″E
- Country: Poland
- Voivodeship: Podkarpackie
- County: Stalowa Wola
- Gmina: Zaleszany

Obojnia [ɔˈbɔi̯ɲa] is a village in the administrative district of Gmina Zaleszany, within Stalowa Wola County, Podkarpackie Voivodeship, in south-eastern Poland.
