= Dzierdziówka =

- Village
- Location within Poland
- Coordinates: 50°39′N 21°57′E
- Country: Poland
- Voivodeship: Subcarpathian
- County: Stalowa Wola
- Gmina: Zaleszany
- Population: 500
- Website: http://www.dzierdziowka.republika.pl/index.html

Dzierdziówka [d͡ʑɛrˈd͡ʑufka] is a village in the administrative district of Gmina Zaleszany, within Stalowa Wola County, Subcarpathian Voivodeship, in south-eastern Poland.
