= Eliasz Kanarek =

Eliasz (Elias) Kanarek (June 21, 1901 – May 6, 1969) was a Polish-born American painter and noted portrait artist.

== Life and work ==
Kanarek was born into a Jewish family in 1901 in Skowierzyn, then Austria-Hungary, modern-day Poland. At the age of twelve years old he studied in Vienna. He served in the Polish army from 1919 to 1920, and in 1923 began attending the Warsaw School of Fine Arts.

There he studied under Tadeusz Pruszkowski, became a member of the 'Brotherhood of Saint Luke', and exhibited his work with this group. He worked as a cartoonist for the weekly „Szpilki” from 1935 to 1938. He also participated in the Venice Biennale in 1934 and exhibited his work at the Carnegie Museum of Art in 1937.

In 1938, he and other members of the Brotherhood of Saint Luke were commissioned to paint seven historical paintings to be displayed in the Polish pavilion at the New York World's Fair in 1939. In March 1939, he and another artist, Bolesaw Cybis, sailed for New York with the paintings for the World's Fair. After the outbreak of World War II later that year, unable to return to his native country, he remained in the United States in exile.

He established his first studio in Washington, D.C., where his masterly art, revealed in his exhibitions, quickly gained him recognition. Subsequently, he moved to Los Angeles, California, where he established his second studio and became a naturalized American citizen on May 14, 1948.

Among his subjects were Associate Justice William O. Douglas, which is on display at the United States Supreme Court, Arthur Rubinstein, Greer Garson, Elizabeth Taylor, Carroll Baker as well as General Marshall.

Later in his life he moved to Scottsville, Virginia, where much of his paintings was done at Jefferson Mill, a mill built by Thomas Jefferson's father. He died in Doctors Hospital in Washington, D.C. on May 6, 1969.
