= Ostrówek Mały =

- Village
- Location within Poland
- Coordinates: 50°37′3″N 21°59′52″E
- Country: Poland
- Voivodeship: Subcarpathian
- County: Stalowa Wola
- Gmina: Zaleszany

Ostrówek Mały [ɔsˈtruvɛk ˈmawɨ] is a village in the administrative district of Gmina Zaleszany, within Stalowa Wola County, Subcarpathian Voivodeship, in south-eastern Poland.
