= Ostrówek Duży =

- Village
- Location within Poland
- Coordinates: 50°36′54″N 21°59′16″E
- Country: Poland
- Voivodeship: Subcarpathian
- County: Stalowa Wola
- Gmina: Zaleszany

Ostrówek Duży [ɔsˈtruvɛk ˈduʐɨ] is a village in the administrative district of Gmina Zaleszany, within Stalowa Wola County, Subcarpathian Voivodeship, in south-eastern Poland.
