= Kąt, Stalowa Wola County =

Kąt
- Village
- Location within Poland
- Coordinates: 50°38′29″N 21°52′43″E
- Country: Poland
- Voivodeship: Subcarpathian
- County: Stalowa Wola
- Gmina: Zaleszany

Kąt [kɔnt] is a village in the administrative district of Gmina Zaleszany, within Stalowa Wola County, Subcarpathian Voivodeship, in south-eastern Poland.
