= Zajeziorze, Podkarpackie Voivodeship =

Zajeziorze
- Village
- Location within Poland
- Coordinates: 50°38′39″N 21°53′5″E
- Country: Poland
- Voivodeship: Subcarpathian
- County: Stalowa Wola
- Gmina: Zaleszany

Zajeziorze [zajɛˈʑɔʐɛ] is a village in the administrative district of Gmina Zaleszany, within Stalowa Wola County, Subcarpathian Voivodeship, in south-eastern Poland.
