= Zbydniów, Podkarpackie Voivodeship =

Zbydniów
- Village
- Location within Poland
- Coordinates: 50°38′N 21°57′E
- Country: Poland
- Voivodeship: Subcarpathian
- County: Stalowa Wola
- Gmina: Zaleszany
- Population: 1,246

Zbydniów [ˈzbɨdɲuf] is a village in the administrative district of Gmina Zaleszany, within Stalowa Wola County, Subcarpathian Voivodeship, in south-eastern Poland.
