= Ruska Wieś, Podkarpackie Voivodeship =

Ruska Wieś
- Settlement
- Location within Poland
- Coordinates: 50°38′9″N 21°54′17″E
- Country: Poland
- Voivodeship: Subcarpathian
- County: Stalowa Wola
- Gmina: Zaleszany

Ruska Wieś [ˈruska ˈvjɛɕ] is a settlement in the administrative district of Gmina Zaleszany, within Stalowa Wola County, Subcarpathian Voivodeship, in south-eastern Poland.
