= Gmina Zaleszany =

Gmina Zaleszany Zaleszany Commune
- Gmina
- Coat of arms
- Interactive map of Gmina Zaleszany
- Coordinates (Zaleszany): 50°39′N 21°54′E
- Country: Poland
- Voivodeship: Subcarpathian
- County: Stalowa Wola
- Seat: Zaleszany

Area
  - Total: 87.31 km^{2} (33.71 sq mi)

Population (2013)
  - Total: 10,904
  - Density: 124.9/km^{2} (323.5/sq mi)
- Website: http://www.zaleszany.pl

Gmina Zaleszany is a rural gmina (administrative district) in Stalowa Wola County, Subcarpathian Voivodeship, in south-eastern Poland. Its seat is the village of Zaleszany, which lies approximately 13 kilometres (8 mi) north-west of Stalowa Wola and 69 km (43 mi) north of the regional capital Rzeszów.

The gmina covers an area of 87.31 square kilometres (33.7 sq mi), and as of 2006 its total population is 10,646 (10,904 in 2013).

== Villages ==
Gmina Zaleszany contains the villages and settlements of Agatówka, Dzierdziówka, Kąt, Kępie Zaleszańskie, Kotowa Wola, Majdan Zbydniowski, Motycze Szlacheckie, Obojnia, Ostrówek Duży, Ostrówek Mały, Pilchów, Ruska Wieś, Skowierzyn, Turbia, Wólka Turebska, Zajeziorze, Zaleszany and Zbydniów.

== Neighbouring gminas ==
Gmina Zaleszany is bordered by the town of Stalowa Wola and by the gminas of Gorzyce, Grębów and Radomyśl nad Sanem.
