= Zaleszany, Podkarpackie Voivodeship =

Zaleszany
- Village
- Location within Poland
- Coordinates: 50°39′N 21°54′E
- Country: Poland
- Voivodeship: Subcarpathian
- County: Stalowa Wola
- Gmina: Zaleszany
- Population: 1,000

Zaleszany [zalɛˈʂanɨ] is a village in Stalowa Wola County, Subcarpathian Voivodeship, in south-eastern Poland. It is the seat of the gmina (administrative district) called Gmina Zaleszany.

Poet and soldier Józef Mączka was born here.
