= The Voice of Poland season 3 =

The Voice of Poland
- Season 3
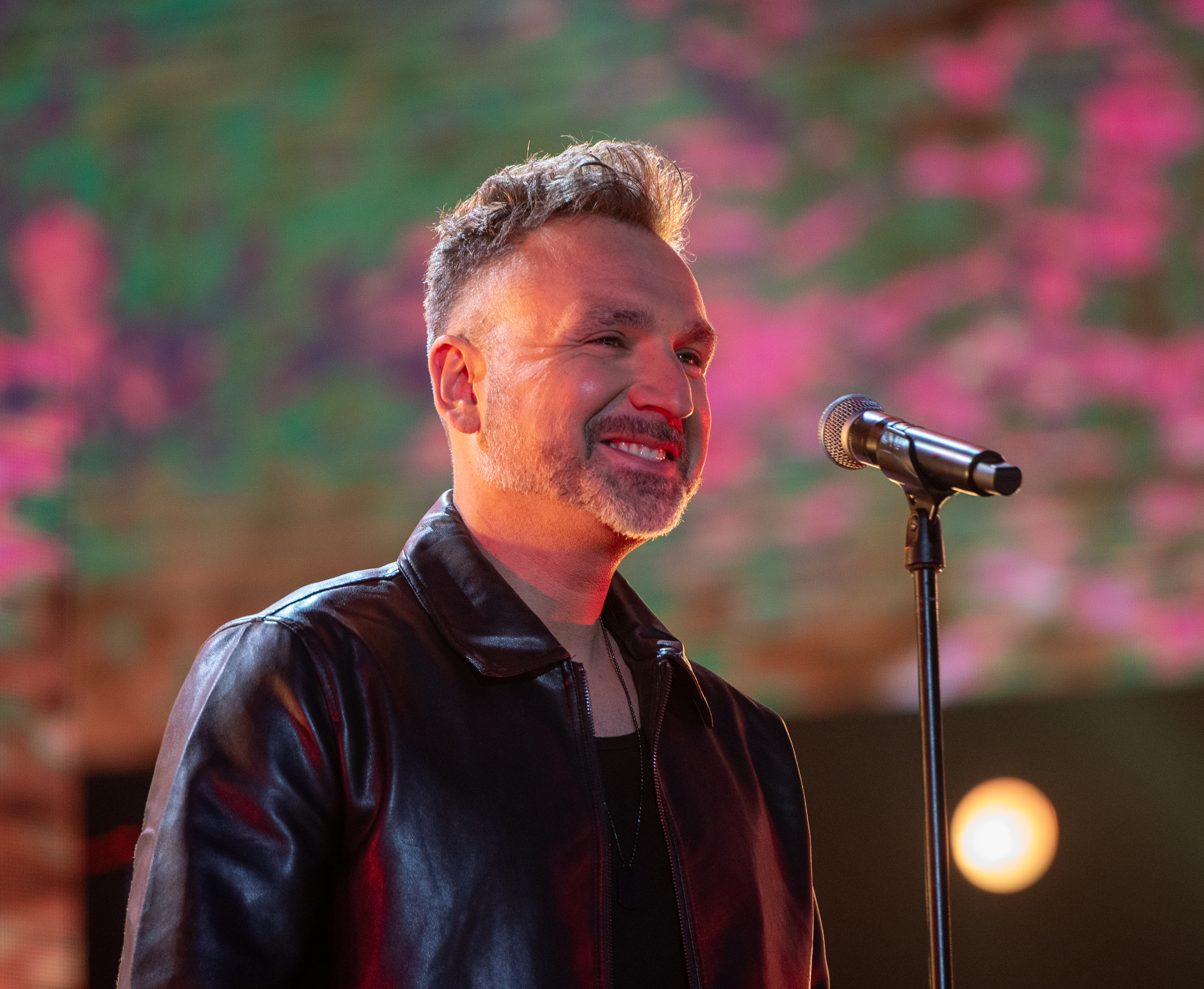
- Hosted by: Tomasz Kammel; Marika; Maciej Musiał (V Reporter)
- Judges: Marek Piekarczyk; Maria Sadowska; Tomson & Baron; Edyta Górniak
- Winner: Mateusz Ziółko
- Runner-up: Ernest Staniaszek

Release
- Original network: TVP2
- Original release: September 7 – November 30, 2013

Season chronology
- ← Previous; Season 2 Next → Season 4

The third season of The Voice of Poland began airing 7 September 2013 on TVP 2.

Mateusz Ziółko won the competition on November 30, 2013, marking Maria Sadowska's first win as a coach, and the first stolen artist to win The Voice of Poland.

== Hosts and coaches ==
It was announced that Justyna Steczkowska will not return because of her pregnancy and work commitments. After her resignation rumors had been circulating that Doda may replace her. However, this information has been soon debunked by TVP. Ewa Farna, Monika Brodka, Edyta Górniak and Maria Peszek were said to join the show. On 2 July 2013, Maria Peszek confirmed that she had received a proposition from the production team, but she hadn't accepted it. Anita Lipnicka, Renata Przemyk, Anna Wyszkoni, Kasia Kowalska, Kasia Nosowska, Urszula, Maria Sadowska and Anna Maria Jopek were also said to be in the running for the role. Tomson & Baron from Afromental and Marek Piekarczyk were expected to return for the next series. On 22 July 2013, Patrycja Markowska announced she would be leaving the show to concentrate on her career.

After weeks of speculations, on 29 July 2013, Marek Piekarczyk, Tomson & Baron, Maria Sadowska and Edyta Górniak were revealed as the judging panel. All hosts from the previous season were said to return. However, Iga Krefft did not return as a V-Reporter.

Coaches and Hosts gallery

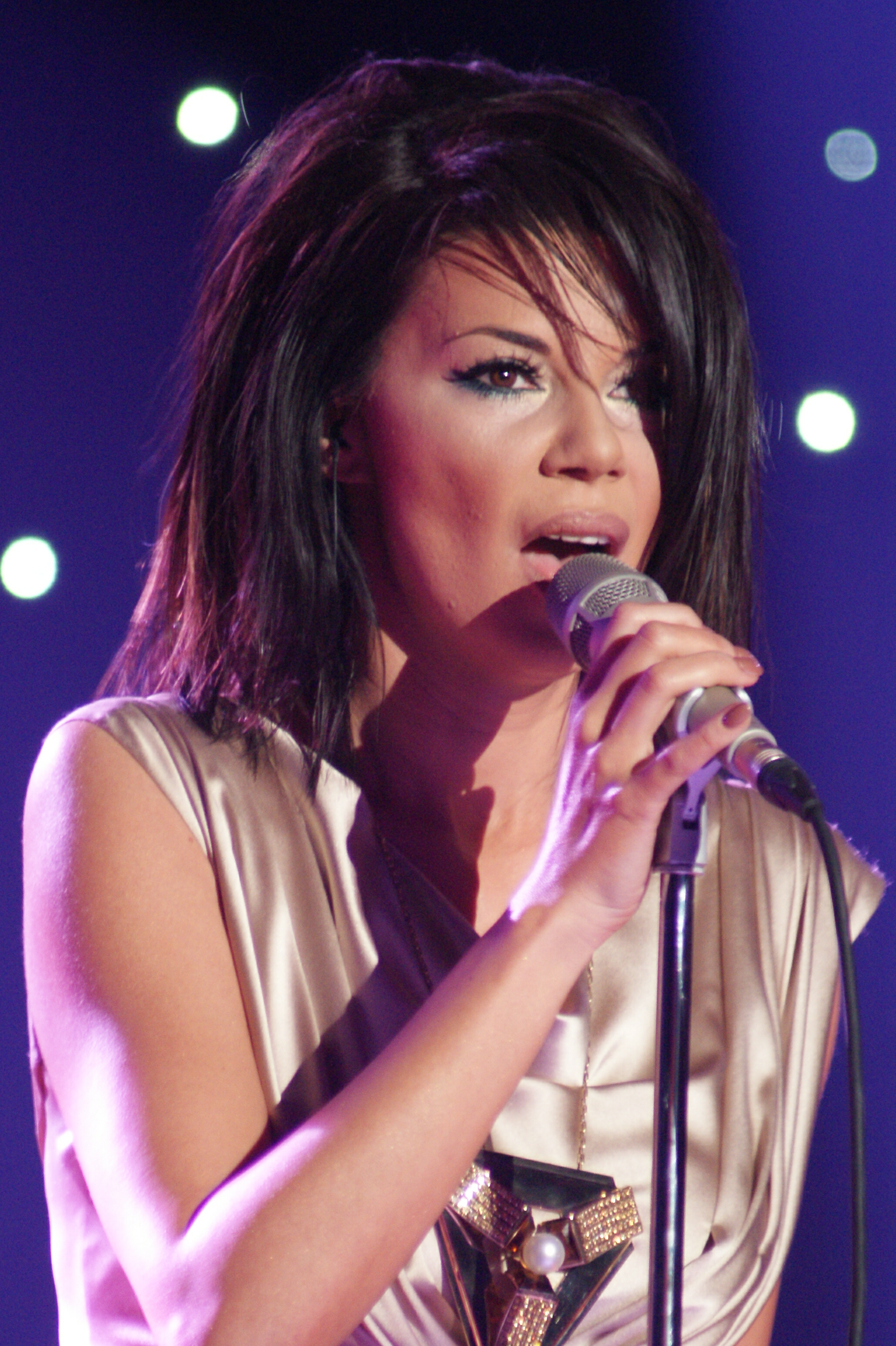
Edyta Górniak

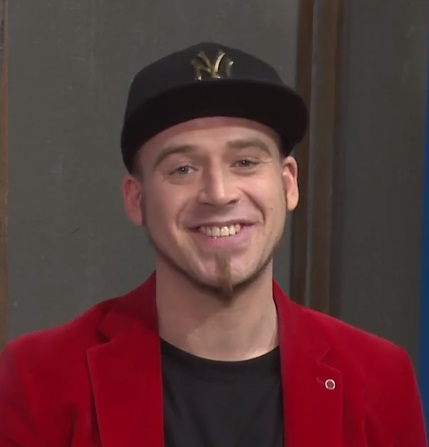
Tomasz Lach (duo)

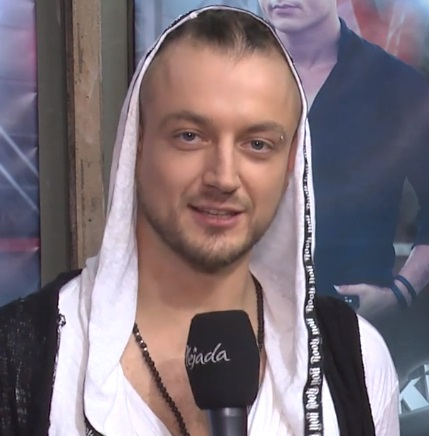
Aleksandr Milwiw-Baron (duo)

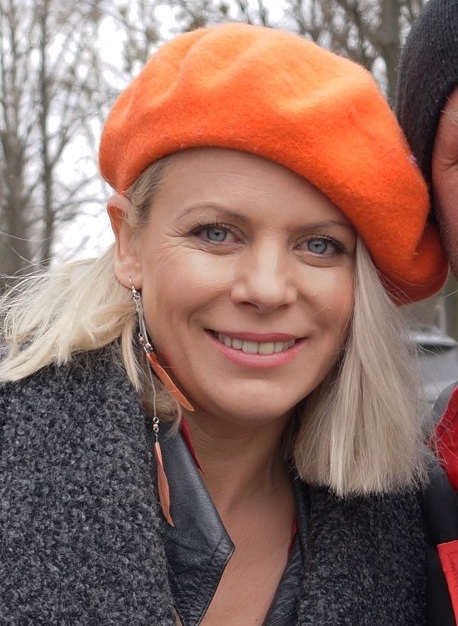
Maria Sadowska

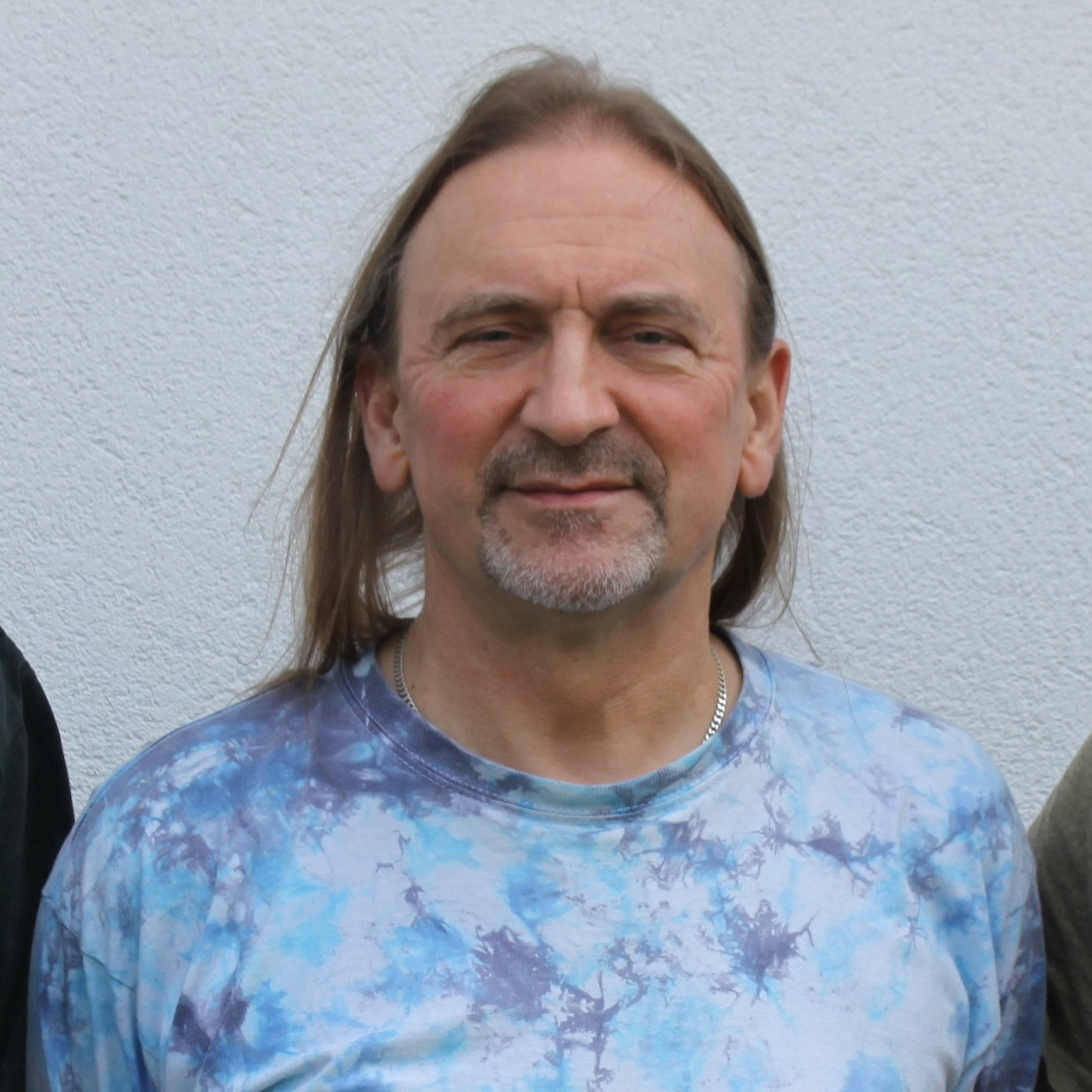
Marek Piekarczyk

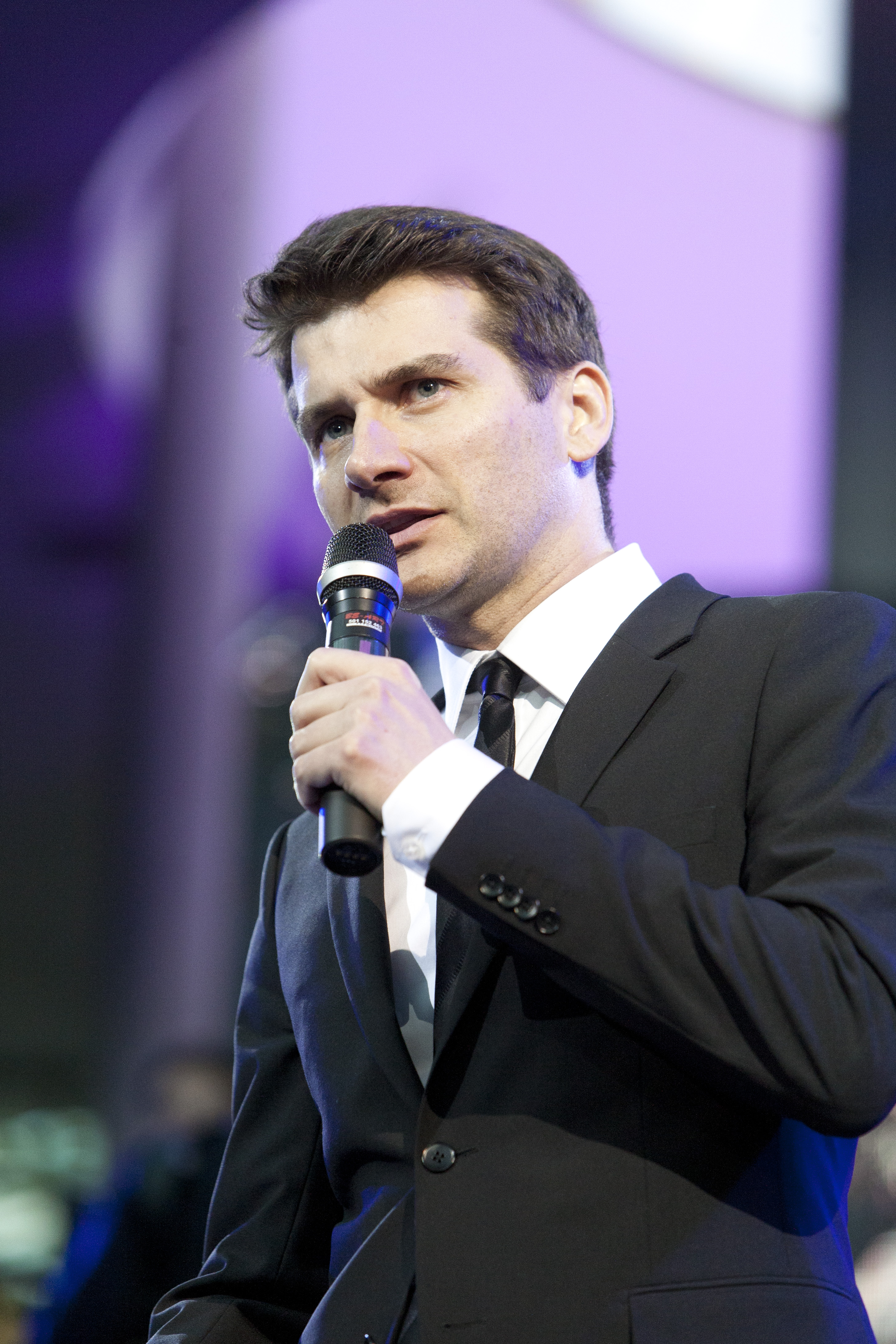
Tomasz Kammel

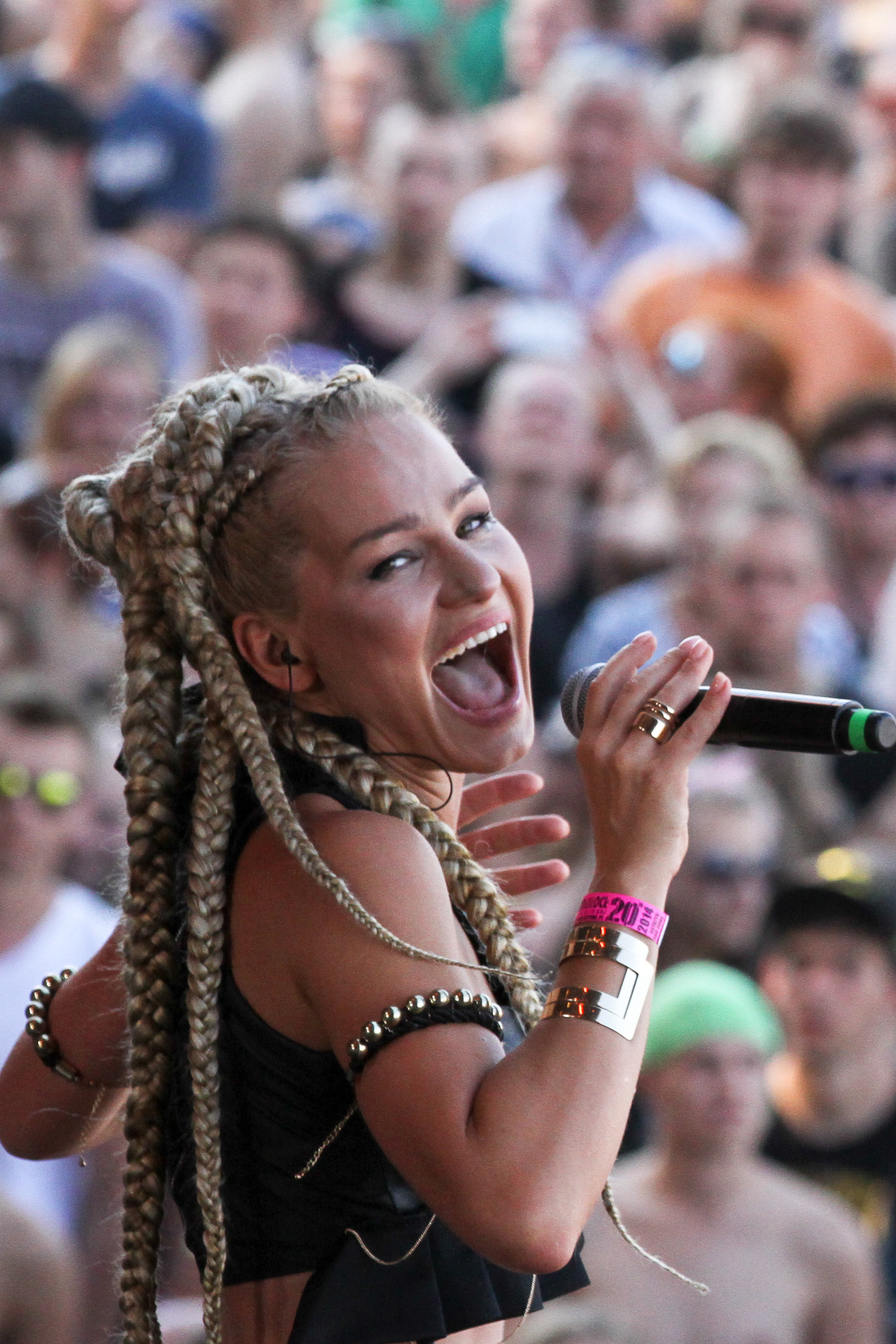
Marta "Marika" Kosakowska

== Auditions ==
Auditions took place on 8 June, 22 June and 15 July 2013 in Warsaw.

== Teams ==
Color key

- Winner
- Runner-up
- Third place
- Fourth place
- Eliminated in the Semifinals
- Eliminated in the Quarterfinals
- Eliminated in the Live round
- Eliminated in the Knockout round
- Artist was stolen by another coach (Name is strikethroughed)
- Eliminated in the Battle rounds

Coaches	Top 48 artists				
Edyta Górniak					
Edyta Górniak	Jagoda Kret	Olga Jankowska	Maia Lasota	Maria Rodriguez	Wiola Kaczmarczyk
Edyta Górniak	Agata Michalska	Cezary Andrzejak	Małgorzata Kornas	~~Natalia Krakowiak~~	~~Marta Maksimiuk~~
Edyta Górniak	Kamil Franczak	Wojciech Władek	Aleksandra Pieczara	Patrycja Mizerska	
Tomson & Baron					
Tomson & Baron	Arkadiusz Kłusowski	Michał Grobelny	Natalia Krakowiak	Michał Malicki	Bartosz Kuśmierczyk
Tomson & Baron	Dorota Theisebach	Katarzyna & Małgorzata Hybiak	Małgorzata Nakonieczna	~~Rafał Sekulak~~	~~Olga Jankowska~~
Tomson & Baron	Ida Zalewska	Edyta Piskorz	Magdalena Banasiuk	Marie Napieralska	
Maria Sadowska					
Maria Sadowska	Mateusz Ziółko	Katarzyna Stanek	Joanna Smajdor	Oksana Predko	Dorota Lembicz
Maria Sadowska	Bartłomiej Broniewski	Marta Maksimiuk	Agnieszka Czyż	~~Marzena Ugorna~~	~~Arkadiusz Kłusowski~~
Maria Sadowska	~~Maria Rodriguez~~	Małgorzata Janek	Barbara Gąsienica-Giewont	Beata Orbik	
Marek Piekarczyk					
Marek Piekarczyk	Ernest Staniaszek	Marzena Ugorna	Nella Marczewski	Magdalena Meisel	Łukasz Juszkiewicz
Marek Piekarczyk	Rafał Sekulak	Aleksandra Berezowska	Olga Dąbrowska	~~Mateusz Ziółko~~	Kaja Tyzenhauz
Marek Piekarczyk	Robert Zelewski	Łukasz Szuba	Iwona Kaczmarczyk	Olga Czyżykiewicz	
Stolen artists are italicized.

== Blind auditions ==
The blind auditions took place from 11 to 14 August 2013.

Color keys

✔	Coach hit his/her "I WANT YOU" button
	Artist defaulted to this coach's team
	Artist elected to join this coach's team
	Artist eliminated with no coach pressing his or her "I WANT YOU" button

=== Episode 1 (September 7, 2013) ===
Order	Artist	Age	Hometown	Song	Coach's and contestant's choices			
Order	Artist	Age	Hometown	Song	Edyta	Tomson & Baron	Maria	Marek
1	Natalia Krakowiak	23	Kołobrzeg	"Listen"	✔	✔	✔	✔
2	Nella Marczewski	18	Warsaw	"Good Luck"	—	✔	—	✔
3	Magda Moyo	20	Poznań	"Songbird"	—	—	—	—
4	Marie Napieralska	39	Warsaw	"Testosteron"	✔	✔	✔	✔
5	Arkadiusz Kłusowski	21	Rzeszów	"Have I Told You Lately"	—	✔	✔	✔

=== Episode 2 (September 7, 2013) ===
Order	Artist	Age	Hometown	Song	Coach's and contestant's choices			
Order	Artist	Age	Hometown	Song	Edyta	Tomson & Baron	Maria	Marek
1	Maria Rodriguez	25	Havana, Cuba	"The Girl from Ipanema"	—	✔	✔	✔
2	Marta Maksimiuk	22	Warsaw	"Ironic"	✔	✔	✔	✔
3	Robert Zelewski	26	Żelistrzewo	"One Way or Another"	—	—	✔	✔
4	Michał Grobelny	19	Szczecin	"When I Was Your Man"	✔	✔	✔	✔
5	Katarzyna Stanek	20	Nowy Sącz	"Running Up That Hill"	✔	—	✔	✔

=== Episode 3 (September 14, 2013) ===
Order	Artist	Age	Hometown	Song	Coach's and contestant's choices			
Order	Artist	Age	Hometown	Song	Edyta	Tomson & Baron	Maria	Marek
1	Dorota Theisebach	20	Gdańsk	"Don't You Remember"	✔	✔	✔	✔
2	Estera Wrona	19	Rogoż	"Jeden moment"	—	—	—	—
3	Barbara Gąsienica-Giewont	21	Zakopane	"When a Man Loves a Woman"	—	—	✔	✔
4	Ernest Staniaszek	24	Piotrków Trybunalski	"Have I Told You Lately"	✔	✔	✔	✔
5	Jagoda Kret	21	Nowy Targ	"A Natural Woman"	✔	—	✔	✔
6	Małgorzata Nakonieczna	20	Iława	"No Freedom"	—	✔	—	✔

=== Episode 4 (September 14, 2013) ===
Order	Artist	Age	Hometown	Song	Coach's and contestant's choices			
Order	Artist	Age	Hometown	Song	Edyta	Tomson & Baron	Maria	Marek
1	Iwona Kaczmarczyk	23	Myśliwiec	"What's Up?"	✔	✔	✔	✔
2	Rafał Sekulak	25	Poznań	"Have a Little Faith in Me"	—	✔	—	✔
3	Aleksandra Chaładaj	16	Warsaw	"Będę z Tobą"	—	—	—	—
4	Bartłomiej Broniewski	19	Nysa	"Always on My Mind"	✔	✔	✔	✔
5	Marzena Ugorna	24	Kamień	"Jestem kamieniem"	—	—	✔	✔
6	Maia Lasota	17	Wrocław	"Next to Me"	✔	✔	—	✔

=== Episode 5 (September 21, 2013) ===
Order	Artist	Age	Hometown	Song	Coach's and contestant's choices			
Order	Artist	Age	Hometown	Song	Edyta	Tomson & Baron	Maria	Marek
1	Michał Malicki	34	Katowice	"My Way"	✔	✔	✔	✔
2	Joanna Smajdor	21	Jastrzębie-Zdrój	"This Love"	✔	✔	✔	✔
3	Alex Lis	20	Poznań	"Should I Stay or Should I Go"	—	—	—	—
4	Monika Wiśniowska	27	Wrocław	"It's a Man's Man's Man's World"	—	—	—	—
5	Agnieszka Bardoń	19	Mogilno	"This Is the Life"	—	—	—	—
6	Dorota Lembicz	31	Poznań	"Znalazłam"	✔	✔	✔	✔
7	Wojciech Władek	27	Lublin	"Drops of Jupiter (Tell Me)"	✔	—	—	—
8	Mateusz Ziółko	27	Zubrzyca Dolna	"When a Man Loves a Woman"	✔	✔	✔	✔

=== Episode 6 (September 21, 2013) ===
Order	Artist	Age	Hometown	Song	Coach's and contestant's choices			
Order	Artist	Age	Hometown	Song	Edyta	Tomson & Baron	Maria	Marek
1	Łukasz Juszkiewicz	27	Ciechanów	"Sen o Victorii"	✔	✔	—	✔
2	Oksana Predko	31	Kętrzyn	"Secrets"	✔	—	✔	✔
3	Natalia Srokocz	27	Ruda Śląska	"Read All About It"	—	—	—	—
4	Patrycja Michalska	17	Chmielnik	"Think"	—	—	—	—
5	Piotr Skóra	31	N/A	"It's a Beautiful Day"	—	—	—	—
6	Wiola Kaczmarczyk	21	Kielce	"Flirt"	✔	—	—	—
7	Nina Major	17	N/A	"Shape of My Heart"	—	—	—	—
8	Agata Michalska	32	Piotrków Trybunalski	"You Know I'm No Good"	✔	—	—	✔
9	Bartosz Kuśmierczyk	25	Chorzele	"Feel"	✔	✔	✔	✔

=== Episode 7 (September 28, 2013) ===
Order	Artist	Age	Hometown	Song	Coach's and contestant's choices			
Order	Artist	Age	Hometown	Song	Edyta	Tomson & Baron	Maria	Marek
1	Patrycja Mizerska	18	Bielawa	"Under"	✔	—	—	—
2	Joanna Kaszta	25	Dziergowice	"Szare miraże"	—	—	—	—
3	Łukasz Szuba	24	Opole	"A Song for You"	✔	—	—	✔
4	Edyta Piskorz	25	Bartoszyce	"Try"	—	✔	—	✔
5	Aleksandra Berezowska	21	Bytom	"Twist in My Sobriety"	—	—	—	✔
6	Kamil Mikos	29	N/A	"Prawdziwe powietrze"	—	—	—	—
7	Dorota Pietraszuk	24	Białystok	"Torn"	—	—	—	—
8	Kacper Andrzejewski	18	Zduńska Wola	"Między ciszą a ciszą"	—	—	—	—
9	Beata Orbik	23	Augustów	"Killing Me Softly with His Song"	✔	✔	✔	✔

=== Episode 8 (September 28, 2013) ===
Order	Artist	Age	Hometown	Song	Coach's and contestant's choices			
Order	Artist	Age	Hometown	Song	Edyta	Tomson & Baron	Maria	Marek
1	Kaja Tyzenhauz	33	Lublin	"Walking in Memphis"	—	—	✔	✔
2	Małgorzata Janek	25	Węgorzewo	"Good Luck"	—	—	✔	✔
3	Alicja Monczkowska	18	Rywałd	"Son of a Preacher Man"	—	—	—	—
4	Patryk Komosa	18	Konstancin-Jeziorna	"Walking in Memphis"	—	—	—	—
5	Emilia Kudra	29	Łódź	"Don't You Remember"	—	—	—	—
6	Paweł Zieliński	41	N/A	"O sobie samym"	—	—	—	—
7	Aleksandra Janecka	21	N/A	"All About the Money"	—	—	—	—
8	Małgorzata Kornas	28	Tczew	"Drops of Jupiter (Tell Me)"	✔	—	—	✔
9	Aleksandra Pieczara	28	Kraków	"Summer in the City"	✔	—	—	✔
10	Katarzyna & Małgorzata Hybiak	24 & 22	Poznań	"Girl on Fire"	✔	✔	✔	✔

=== Episode 9 (October 5, 2013) ===
Order	Artist	Age	Hometown	Song	Coach's and contestant's choices			
Order	Artist	Age	Hometown	Song	Edyta	Tomson & Baron	Maria	Marek
1	Magdalena Meisel	35	Starachowice	"Shape of My Heart"	—	—	—	✔
2	Krzysztof Spychała	21	Poznań	"Ho Hey"	—	—	—	—
3	Cezary Andrzejak	33	Poznań	"Feel"	✔	✔	—	✔
4	Magdalena Banasiuk	19	Ostróda	"Lost"	—	✔	✔	✔
5	Beata Michalak-Górna	30	Konin	"Time Is Running Out"	—	—	—	—
6	Marcin Staszek	22	Ćwiklice	"Time Is Running Out"	—	—	—	—
7	Małgorzata Stec	24	N/A	"Szare miraże"	—	—	—	—
8	Olga Dąbrowska	23	N/A	"Light My Fire"	—	—	—	✔
9	Kamil Franczak	24	Nysa	"Faith"	✔	✔	✔	✔

=== Episode 10 (October 5, 2013) ===
Order	Artist	Age	Hometown	Song	Coach's and contestant's choices			
Order	Artist	Age	Hometown	Song	Edyta	Tomson & Baron	Maria	Marek
1	Olga Czyżykiewicz	29	Kraków	"Have a Little Faith in Me"	—	✔	—	✔
2	Bartłomiej Sudak	24	N/A	"Na jednej z dzikich plaż"	—	—	—	—
3	Marlena Sudak	20	N/A	"Summer in the City"	—	—	—	—
4	Ida Zalewska	32	Warsaw	"A Song for You"	—	✔	—	✔
5	Olga Jankowska	21	Warsaw	"Valerie"	✔	✔	—	✔
6	Małgorzata Uściłowska	26	Warsaw	"Imagine"	—	—	—	—
7	Agnieszka Czyż	31	Poznań	"Another Day"	✔	✔	✔	✔

== The Battle Rounds ==
The Battle Rounds will take place from 9 to 11 September 2013. In this season each coach can steal two contestants from another team.

Color keys

Artist won the Battle and advances to the Knockouts
Artist lost the Battle but was stolen by another coach and advances to the Knockouts
Artist lost the Battle and was eliminated

Episode & Date	Coach	Order	Winner	Song	Loser	'Steal' result			
Episode & Date	Coach	Order	Winner	Song	Loser	Edyta	Tomson & Baron	Maria	Marek
Episode 11 (October 12)	Maria Sadowska	1	Agnieszka Czyż	"Say Say Say"	Arkadiusz Kłusowski	✔	✔	—N/a	✔
Episode 11 (October 12)	Marek Piekarczyk	2	Łukasz Juszkiewicz	"Niewiele Ci mogę dać"	Olga Czyżykiewicz	—	—	—	—N/a
Episode 11 (October 12)	Tomson & Baron	3	Małgorzata Nakonieczna	"Umbrella"	Edyta Piskorz	—	—N/a	—	—
Episode 11 (October 12)	Edyta Górniak	4	Małgorzata Kornas	"Nie mogę Cię zapomnieć"	Patrycja Mizerska	—N/a	—	—	—
Episode 11 (October 12)	Maria Sadowska	5	Joanna Smajdor	"I Can't Make You Love Me"	Marzena Ugorna	—	—	—N/a	✔
Episode 11 (October 12)	Tomson & Baron	6	Michał Malicki	"As"	Ida Zalewska	—	—N/a	—	—
Episode 11 (October 12)	Marek Piekarczyk	7	Ernest Staniaszek	"Zabiorę Cię"	Mateusz Ziółko	—	—	✔	—N/a
Episode 11 (October 12)	Edyta Górniak	8	Maia Lasota	"I'll Be There"	Marta Maksimiuk	—N/a	—	✔	—
Episode 12 (October 19)	Tomson & Baron	1	Bartosz Kuśmierczyk	"Inspirations"	Olga Jankowska	✔	—N/a	—N/a	✔
Episode 12 (October 19)	Marek Piekarczyk	2	Nella Marczewski	"Babę zesłał Bóg"	Iwona Kaczmarczyk	—	—	—N/a	—N/a
Episode 12 (October 19)	Edyta Górniak	3	Wiola Kaczmarczyk	"Sweet Dreams (Are Made of This)"	Aleksandra Pieczara	—N/a	—	—N/a	—
Episode 12 (October 19)	Maria Sadowska	4	Oksana Predko	"Jesteś lekiem na całe zło"	Beata Orbik	—	—	—N/a	—
Episode 12 (October 19)	Marek Piekarczyk	5	Aleksandra Berezowska	"Sen"	Łukasz Szuba	—	—	—N/a	—N/a
Episode 12 (October 19)	Edyta Górniak	6	Jagoda Kret	"When You Believe"	Natalia Krakowiak	—N/a	✔	—N/a	—
Episode 12 (October 19)	Tomson & Baron	7	Michał Grobelny	"Sorry Seems to Be the Hardest Word"	Rafał Sekulak	—	—N/a	—N/a	✔
Episode 12 (October 19)	Maria Sadowska	8	Katarzyna Stanek	"Sing It Back"	Barbara Gąsienica-Giewont	—	—N/a	—N/a	—N/a
Episode 13 (October 26)	Tomson & Baron	1	Dorota Theisebach	"A Woman's Worth"	Marie Napieralska	—	—N/a	—N/a	—N/a
Episode 13 (October 26)	Marek Piekarczyk	2	Olga Dąbrowska	"Przygoda bez miłości"	Robert Zelewski	—	—N/a	—N/a	—N/a
Episode 13 (October 26)	Maria Sadowska	3	Dorota Lembicz	"Szał"	Małgorzata Janek	—	—N/a	—N/a	—N/a
Episode 13 (October 26)	Edyta Górniak	4	Cezary Andrzejak	"Wonderwall"	Wojciech Władek	—N/a	—N/a	—N/a	—N/a
Episode 13 (October 26)	Tomson & Baron	5	Katarzyna & Małgorzata Hybiak	"Don't Let Go (Love)"	Magdalena Banasiuk	—	—N/a	—N/a	—N/a
Episode 13 (October 26)	Marek Piekarczyk	6	Magdalena Meisel	"Dziś już wiem"	Kaja Tyzenhauz	—	—N/a	—N/a	—N/a
Episode 13 (October 26)	Maria Sadowska	7	Bartłomiej Broniewski	"Hit the Road Jack"	Maria Rodriguez	✔	—N/a	—N/a	—N/a
Episode 13 (October 26)	Edyta Górniak	8	Agata Michalska	"Impossible"	Kamil Franczak	—N/a	—N/a	—N/a	—N/a

== The Knockouts ==
Before each knockout round the coach chooses two artists from their team to get a "fast pass" to the live shows, the remaining six artists from that team are then split up into two groups of three. At the end of each knockout round the coach then decides out of the three artists who wins, and therefore makes up their four artists to take to the live shows.

=== Episode 14 (November 2, 2013) ===
Color keys

Artist won the Knockouts and advances to the Live shows
Artist lost the Knockouts and was eliminated

Order	Coach	Song	Winner	Loser	Song
1	Edyta Górniak	"Ain't No Sunshine"	Olga Jankowska	Małgorzata Kornas	"Have a Little Faith in Me"
1	Edyta Górniak	"Ain't No Sunshine"	Olga Jankowska	Cezary Andrzejak	"Waiting on the World to Change"
2	Edyta Górniak	"This Will Be (An Everlasting Love)"	Maria Rodriguez	Agata Michalska	"A Night like This"
2	Edyta Górniak	"This Will Be (An Everlasting Love)"	Maria Rodriguez	Wiola Kaczmarczyk	"Move in the Right Direction"
3	Marek Piekarczyk	"Should I Stay or Should I Go"	Nella Marczewski	Olga Dąbrowska	"Biała flaga"
3	Marek Piekarczyk	"Should I Stay or Should I Go"	Nella Marczewski	Aleksandra Berezowska	"Isn't She Lovely?"
4	Marek Piekarczyk	"Co mi Panie dasz?"	Magdalena Meisel	Rafał Sekulak	"C'est la vie"
4	Marek Piekarczyk	"Co mi Panie dasz?"	Magdalena Meisel	Łukasz Juszkiewicz	"When a Man Loves a Woman"
5	Tomson & Baron	"Bleeding Love"	Natalia Krakowiak	Małgorzata Nakonieczna	"Skłamałam"
5	Tomson & Baron	"Bleeding Love"	Natalia Krakowiak	Katarzyna & Małgorzata Hybiak	"Valerie"
6	Tomson & Baron	"Sen o Victorii"	Michał Malicki	Dorota Theisebach	"Good Luck"
6	Tomson & Baron	"Sen o Victorii"	Michał Malicki	Bartosz Kuśmierczyk	"Faith"
7	Maria Sadowska	"Highway to Hell"	Mateusz Ziółko	Agnieszka Czyż	"End of the Road"
7	Maria Sadowska	"Highway to Hell"	Mateusz Ziółko	Marta Maksimiuk	"Za późno"
8	Maria Sadowska	"No Freedom"	Oksana Predko	Bartłomiej Broniewski	"O sobie samym"
8	Maria Sadowska	"No Freedom"	Oksana Predko	Dorota Lembicz	"What's Up?"

== Live Shows ==
Color keys

Artist was saved by Public's vote
Artist was saved by his/her coach
Artist was eliminated

=== Episode 15 (November 9, 2013) ===
Order	Coach	Artist	Song	Result
1	Tomson & Baron	Michał Grobelny	"Iris"	Public's vote
2	Tomson & Baron	Natalia Krakowiak	"Halo"	Tomson & Baron's choice
3	Tomson & Baron	Michał Malicki	"Kiss from a Rose"	Eliminated
4	Tomson & Baron	Arkadiusz Kłusowski	"Angie"	Public's vote
5	Maria Sadowska	Katarzyna Stanek	"Granda"	Public's vote
6	Maria Sadowska	Joanna Smajdor	"Blame It on the Boogie"	Maria's choice
7	Maria Sadowska	Mateusz Ziółko	"Jednego serca"	Public's vote
8	Maria Sadowska	Oksana Predko	"Jungle Drum"	Eliminated
9	Marek Piekarczyk	Ernest Staniaszek	"Do kołyski"	Public's vote
10	Marek Piekarczyk	Nella Marczewski	"Pomaluj moje sny"	Public's vote
11	Marek Piekarczyk	Marzena Ugorna	"Wymyśliłem Ciebie"	Marek's choice
12	Marek Piekarczyk	Magdalena Meisel	"Cykady na Cykladach"	Eliminated
13	Edyta Górniak	Olga Jankowska	"Candyman"	Public's vote
14	Edyta Górniak	Maia Lasota	"A to co mam..."	Public's vote
15	Edyta Górniak	Jagoda Kret	"Can't Take My Eyes Off You"	Edyta's choice
16	Edyta Górniak	Maria Rodriguez	"Fever"	Eliminated

Non-competition performances
Order	Performers	Song
1	Top 16 finalists	"Some Nights"
2	Team Tomson & Baron	"Wanna Be Startin' Somethin'"
3	Alain Clark	"Blow Me Away"
4	Team Maria Sadowska	"Chcemy tylko tańczyć"
5	Nabiha	"Mind the Gap"
6	Team Marek Piekarczyk	"Marsz wilków"
7	Alain Clark & Michał Sobierajski	"Back in My World"
8	Team Edyta Górniak	"Respect"

=== Quarterfinal (November 16, 2013) ===
Order	Coach	Artist	Song	Result
1	Marek Piekarczyk	Marzena Ugorna	"It's a Man's Man's Man's World"	Public's vote
2	Marek Piekarczyk	Ernest Staniaszek	"Polski"	Marek's choice
3	Marek Piekarczyk	Nella Marczewski	"Me & Mr Jones"	Eliminated
4	Tomson & Baron	Natalia Krakowiak	"Hurt"	Eliminated
5	Tomson & Baron	Michał Grobelny	"Beat It"	Tomson & Baron's choice
6	Tomson & Baron	Arkadiusz Kłusowski	"Still Got the Blues (For You)"	Public's vote
7	Edyta Górniak	Maia Lasota	"Rolling in the Deep"	Eliminated
8	Edyta Górniak	Jagoda Kret	"Get Here"	Edyta's choice
9	Edyta Górniak	Olga Jankowska	"Can't Get You Out of My Head"	Public's vote
10	Maria Sadowska	Mateusz Ziółko	"Pride (In the Name of Love)"	Public's vote
11	Maria Sadowska	Joanna Smajdor	"Warszawa"	Eliminated
12	Maria Sadowska	Katarzyna Stanek	"Waiting All Night"	Maria's choice

Non-competition performances
Order	Performers	Song
1	Marika	"Siła ognia"
2	Marek Piekarczyk	"Blues mojego serca"
3	Afromental	"Rise of the Rage"
4	Edyta Górniak	"Litania"
5	Maria Sadowska	"Baba za kierownicą"

=== Semifinal (November 23, 2013) ===
Coach	Artist	Order	Solo song	Order	Duet	Order	Finalist's song	Summary of points			Result
Coach	Artist	Order	Solo song	Order	Duet	Order	Finalist's song	Coach's	Public's	Total	Result
Edyta Górniak	Olga Jankowska	1	"Tego chciałam"	3	"Piosenka księżycowa"	Already eliminated		35.00	55.76	90.76	Eliminated
Edyta Górniak	Jagoda Kret	2	"Nie proszę o więcej"	3	"Piosenka księżycowa"	4	"A Natural Woman"	65.00	44.24	109.24	Safe
Maria Sadowska	Mateusz Ziółko	5	"Bohemian Rhapsody"	7	"Mamona"	8	"Highway to Hell"	55.00	66.21	121.21	Safe
Maria Sadowska	Katarzyna Stanek	6	"Vogue"	7	"Mamona"	Already eliminated		45.00	33.79	78.79	Eliminated
Marek Piekarczyk	Marzena Ugorna	9	"Zegarmistrz światła"	11	"Wiem, że nie wrócisz"	Already eliminated		40.00	34.75	74.75	Eliminated
Marek Piekarczyk	Ernest Staniaszek	10	"Mama, I'm Coming Home"	11	"Wiem, że nie wrócisz"	12	"Have I Told You Lately"	60.00	65.25	125.25	Safe
Tomson & Baron	Michał Grobelny	13	"Just the Way You Are"	15	"Stand by My Woman"	Already eliminated		49.00	31.25	80.25	Eliminated
Tomson & Baron	Arkadiusz Kłusowski	14	"Crazy"	15	"Stand by My Woman"	16	"A Song for You"	51.00	68.75	119.75	Safe

Non-competition performances
Order	Performers	Song
1	Marika	"Risk Risk"

=== Final (November 30, 2013) ===
Coach	Artist	Order	Solo song	Order	Duet song	Duet with	Order	Duet with coach	Order	Finalist's song	Result
Maria Sadowska	Mateusz Ziółko	1	"Earth Song"	6	"Jak skała"	Kayah	10	"Kiedy nie ma miłości"	14	"How to Win (a Love)"	Winner
Marek Piekarczyk	Ernest Staniaszek	5	"Nights in White Satin"	2	"Wielokropek"	Patrycja Markowska	11	"List do M"	13	"Bejbe"	Runner-up
Edyta Górniak	Jagoda Kret	3	"At Last"	8	"Bang Bang"	Ania Dąbrowska	9	"Nothing Else Matters"	Already eliminated		Fourth place
Tomson & Baron	Arkadiusz Kłusowski	7	"What a Wonderful World"	4	"Skłam"	Justyna Steczkowska	12	"The Show Must Go On"	Already eliminated		Third place

Non-competition performances
Order	Performers	Song
1	Top 4 finalists	"Blurred Lines"
2	Top 16 finalists and Bartosz Kuśmierczyk	"Love Me Again"
3	Natalia Sikora	"Koniec"

== Results summary of live shows ==
Color keys
Artist's info

- Artist from Team Edyta
- Artist from Team Maria
- Artist from Team Tomson & Baron
- Artist from Team Marek

Result details

- Artist was proclaimed as winner
- Artist was proclaimed as runner-up
- Artist was proclaimed as third place
- Artist was proclaimed as fourth place
- Artist advanced to the finals
- Artist was saved by his/her coach
- Artist was saved by the public
- Artist received the fewest accumulated total points and was eliminated
- Artist received the fewest of the public's vote and was eliminated

Live show results per week
Artist	Week 1	Week 2	Week 3	Final
Mateusz Ziółko	Safe	Safe	Advanced	Winner
Ernest Staniaszek	Safe	Safe	Advanced	Runner-up
Arkadiusz Kłusowski	Safe	Safe	Advanced	3rd place
Jagoda Kret	Safe	Safe	Advanced	4th place
Katarzyna Stanek	Safe	Safe	Eliminated	Eliminated (Week 3)
Marzena Ugorna	Safe	Safe	Eliminated	Eliminated (Week 3)
Michał Grobelny	Safe	Safe	Eliminated	Eliminated (Week 3)
Olga Jankowska	Safe	Safe	Eliminated	Eliminated (Week 3)
Joanna Smajdor	Safe	Eliminated	Eliminated (Week 2)	
Maia Lasota	Safe	Eliminated	Eliminated (Week 2)	
Natalia Krakowiak	Safe	Eliminated	Eliminated (Week 2)	
Nella Marczewski	Safe	Eliminated	Eliminated (Week 2)	
Magdalena Meisel	Eliminated	Eliminated (Week 1)		
Maria Rodriguez	Eliminated	Eliminated (Week 1)		
Michał Malicki	Eliminated	Eliminated (Week 1)		
Oksana Predko	Eliminated	Eliminated (Week 1)		

== Contestants' appearances on earlier talent shows ==
- Natalia Krakowiak and Estera Wrona appeared on children's talent show Od przedszkola do Opola.
- Nella Marczewski was a contestant on the second and third season of X Factor. She failed to get through the Bootcamp stage both seasons.
- Michał Grobelny reached the semifinals on the third season of Mam talent!.
- Małgorzata Nakonieczna sang in the blind auditions of season two of The Voice of Poland and failed to make a team, but was able to turn chairs this season.
- Joanna Smajdor, along with Katarzyna Kowalczuk, performed in season two of Mam talent!. They were eliminated in semifinal.
- Monika Wiśniowska competed on the fourth season of Idol. She advanced to the semifinals.
- Mateusz Ziółko reached the final on the first season of Mam talent!. Later, he was a semifinalist on season four of Must Be the Music. Tylko muzyka.
- Monika Wiśniowska and Łukasz Szuba are part of a group Soul City which had competed on the second season of X Factor. They placed fifth.
- Aleksandra Pieczara sang in the blind auditions of season one of The Voice of Poland and joined Ania Dąbrowska's team. She was eliminated in the Sing-off stage, right before the live shows.
- Patryk Komosa and Magdalena Meisel made it to the Bootcamp stage on X Factor season two.
- Ida Zalewska and Paweł Zieliński appeared on Droga do Gwiazd seasons three and four respectively.
- Dorota Theisebach, Joanna Smajdor, Joanna Kaszta, Magdalena Meisel and Kaja Tyzenhauz were contestants on first season of Bitwa na głosy.
- Estera Wrona, Rafał Sekulak, Dorota Lembicz and Kacper Andrzejewski appeared on second season of Bitwa na głosy.
- Barbara Gąsienica-Giewont, Małgorzata Nakonieczna, Patrycja Michalska, Magdalena Banasiuk, Patryk Komosa and Krzysztof Spychała appeared on third season of Bitwa na głosy.
- Many of the contestants sang in Szansa na sukces.
