= Skowierzyn =

- Village
- Location within Poland
- Coordinates: 50°41′N 21°55′E
- Country: Poland
- Voivodeship: Subcarpathian
- County: Stalowa Wola
- Gmina: Zaleszany

Skowierzyn [skɔˈvjɛʐɨn] is a village in the administrative district of Gmina Zaleszany, within Stalowa Wola County, Subcarpathian Voivodeship, in south-eastern Poland.

== Unia Skowierzyn ==
Ludowy Zespół Sportowy Unia Skowierzyn is a Polish football club, which competes in the A-class, the seventh-tier of professional football. The club was founded in 1956, and has a yellow-black-green color.
