= Kotowa Wola =

- Village
- Location within Poland
- Coordinates: 50°37′N 21°56′E
- Country: Poland
- Voivodeship: Subcarpathian
- County: Stalowa Wola
- Gmina: Zaleszany

Kotowa Wola [kɔˈtɔva ˈvɔla] is a village in the administrative district of Gmina Zaleszany, within Stalowa Wola County, Subcarpathian Voivodeship, in southeastern Poland.
