= Józef Mączka =

Polish soldier and poet (1888–1918)

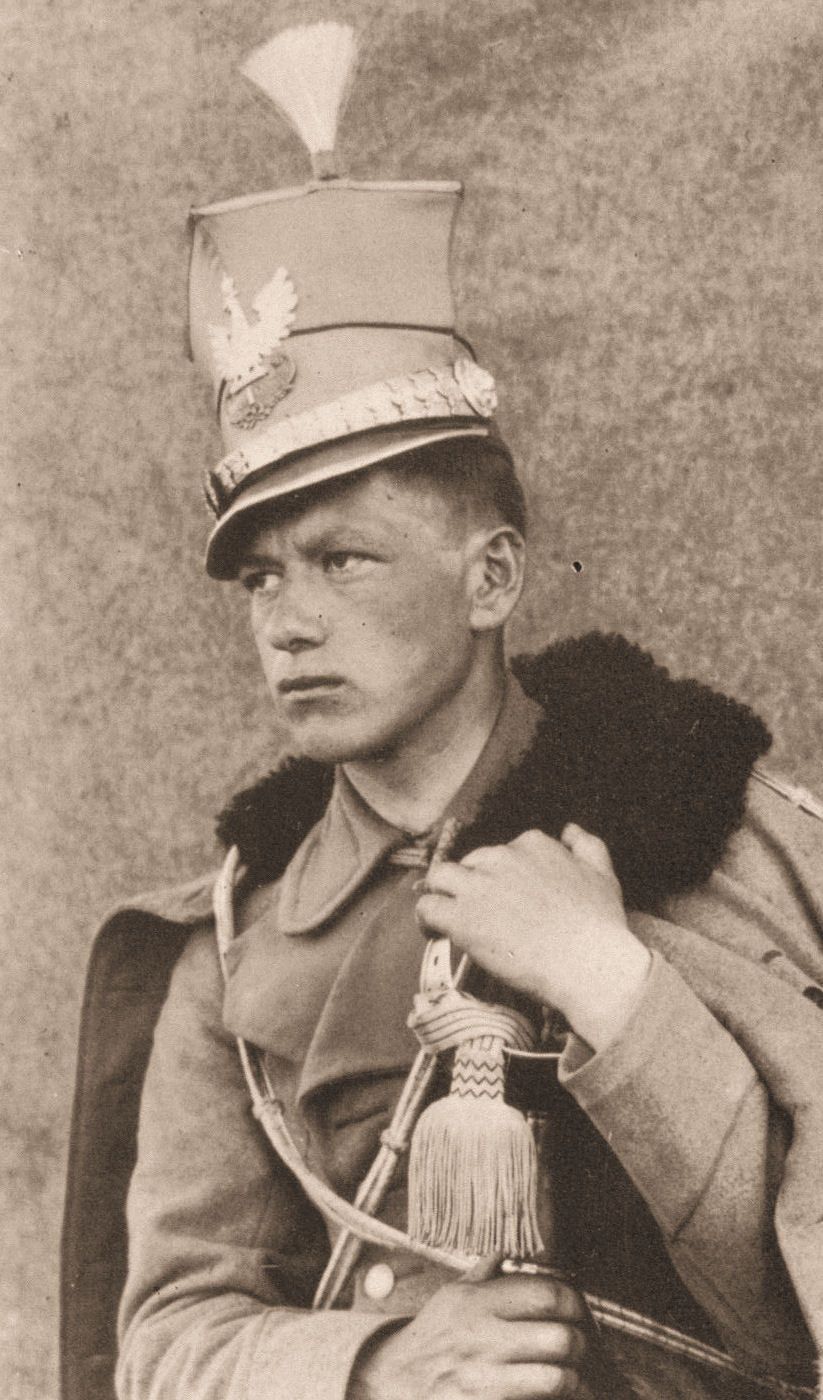
- Józef Mączka
- Born: 2 June 1888; Zaleszany, Congress Poland
- Died: 9 September 1918 (aged 30) near Yekaterinodar, Kuban
- Resting place: Powązki Military Cemetery
- Education: Lwów Polytechnic
- Occupations: Poet, soldier

Józef Mieczysław Mączka (2 June 1888– 9 September 1918) was a Polish soldier, poet of the Polish Legions.

He was born in the village of Zaleszany to Franciszek Mączka, who as a teenager fought in the January Uprising in 1863.

Józef Mączka attended primary school in Oleszyce, later grammar schools (gymnasiums) in Lwów, Sanok, and since 1905 in Rzeszów, where he graduated in 1907. He later started engineering studies at the Lwów Polytechnic.

In 1913, he became a member of the Riflemen's Association, and by August 1914 had become a soldier of the Polish Legions in the 2nd Squadron of Uhlans, led by Zbigniew Dunin-Wasowicz. Mączka served there until September 1914. He took part in the Carpathian and Bukovinian campaigns. On 1 November 1916, he was promoted to the rank of second lieutenant. After the Oath crisis, he served in the Polish Auxiliary Corps. He was promoted to the rank of lieutenant in 1917.

In February 1918, Mączka was captured and interned by Austrians. On 28 February, he escaped from the camp disguised as a railway worker and on 20 March became a soldier of Polish II Corps in Russia under General Józef Haller. In the battle of Kaniów, he was captured by the Germans. Mączka however escaped and started to work in the Polish Military Organization, in the section active in Ukraine. He helped to transfer soldiers of the Polish Legions to Kuban under the division of General Lucjan Żeligowski, eventually becoming a soldier of this division himself in the group of Col. Zieliński.

On 9 September 1918, Lt. Józef Mączka died of cholera in Pashkovska Stanitsa near Yekaterinodar. For his participation in the battles of the Legions and his work in Polish Military Organization, Lt. Mączka was awarded the Virtuti Militari, Cross of Valour, Cross of Independence and Cross of Merit with Swords. In 1933, his remains were brought to Warsaw and ceremonially buried at Powązki Military Cemetery.

Józef Mączka was also a known poet, and the most important poet of the Polish Legions. On Christmas Eve of 1914, he wrote a Christmas carol for the Legions. In 1917, he published the poetry collection Starym szlakiem (On the Old Path), which was republished three times during the interwar period.

In November 1998, a memorial obelisk to Mączka was unveiled in his birthplace of Zaleszany.

== Works ==
- Starym szlakiem (1917)
- Wstań Polsko moja (1997)
- Starym szlakiem i inne wiersze (2009)
