= List of The Power of Five characters =

This is a list of all the antagonists and protagonists in The Power of Five series by Anthony Horowitz. The series chronicles the war between the Old Ones and the Five Gatekeepers. The Five are Matthew Freeman, Pedro/Inti, Scott and Jamie Tyler (Flint and Sapling) and Scarlett Adams (Scar, or Lin Mo, the Chinese goddess of the sea). The Old Ones ruled the world for eighty years at the dawn of humanity, but the Five defeated them, and threw them into Hell, causing the demons to await their return for millennia. Two gates were built in between Earth and Hell to keep the Old Ones out - these are the focus of the series and consist of Raven's Gate, and the Nazca Desert, which is the second gate.

The only characters to physically appear in all five books are Matthew Freeman, Richard Cole and Chaos the King of the Old Ones.

Although it may seem like the characters are very clear-cut, some are neutral (for example Paul Adams and the Incas). Even the Old Ones themselves can appear decent and friendly - this is their main weapon such as how Audrey Cheng uses her charisma to influence Scarlett when in human form.

It is initially unknown who is behind the power of the Five, but eventually it is revealed to be the Librarian: a God-like being (who in fact equates with God) who is revealed as the father of the Five. The world in which the Librarian lives is strangely dead, with no colour, and is revealed to be a place the Five can use to see each other in dreams when they sleep. Eventually, in the final book, they leave for the Dreamworld forever, hinting that the Dreamworld is actually Heaven.

== Protagonists ==
=== The Five ===
==== Matt Freeman ====
Matt is the first of the Five and the leader of the Five, and is the main protagonist in the first two novels, Raven's Gate and Evil Star. He did reappear in the third novel Nightrise, but only very briefly when Scott and Jamie Tyler appeared in the Nazca Desert, the place where Matt and Pedro were staying in Professor Chamber's hacienda. Matt is not the main protagonist in book four, as Scarlett Adams (who is the fifth of the Five) takes the role; however, he makes a bigger appearance than he did in Nightrise.

Matt's powers are telekinesis, as well as clairvoyance; his powers are stronger when he is with another of the five but it has also proven to be unstoppable with just extreme will. When he activates his power, he can smell burnt toast, as this is what he could smell the day his parents died. This is first shown when he tries to steal from a warehouse in Ipswich, and senses the security guard. He always blames himself for not warning his parents the accident which would occur, as he knew his parents would not believe him. He regretted not doing damage to the car to prevent them from going out.

In Evil Star, Matt meets Pedro, the second of the five, and they together figure out the location of the second gate in Nazca Lines which is about to be smashed. However, their efforts were in vain as the gate unlocked at the stroke of midnight on Inti Raymi and the Old Ones finally re-entered the world.

In Necropolis, Matt enters the door in Tai Shan Temple in Hong Kong along with Lohan Shan-tung and arrive in Belem, Brazil ten years later, in Oblivion. Due to the fact that they need money, Lohan sells Matt on the slave market, takes the money and then saves Matt, repeatedly. Having read his life book in the dreamworld library, Matt knows what he has to do, and tells Lohan that they need to head for Antarctica where the Old Ones hold a base called Oblivion. After Scott's betrayal, he decides to meet him himself along with Richard and they are captured and tortured by the Old Ones. However, knowing what needs to be done, Richard kills Matt, who is then replaced by his old self from the past. When Scott also dies, Flint also arrives from the past and the Five successfully defeat the Old Ones once again. Matt and Scott are later buried side by side in Oblivion by Richard and the remaining Five.

Matt is described as being muscular but slim and very good looking. It describes Matt in the book as having the look of a male model and/or footballer. He has dark hair that is for most of the books cut short. His eyes are often described as being an intense, vivid blue in colour. His past incarnation is also called Matt, as he preferred the name better.

Matt can communicate with other four in a dream world. The dream world is on a beach in neither day nor night.

==== Pedro ====
Pedro is the second of the Five and is first introduced in the second book, Evil Star. Pedro lived as a beggar in Lima, Peru.

Pedro began life in a small village in the Canta province. When he was six years old, the River Chillón burst its banks and Pedro's family were killed in the flood. Pedro joined a group of survivors who went to Lima, where he eventually ended up in the care of a man named Sebastian with many other children. He lived there, performing tricks to people passing by, and robbing rich tourists. However, he then met Matthew Freeman and travelled with him.

Pedro also bears a strong resemblance to Manco Cápac, the founder of the Inca Empire. Pedro's power is healing. He could heal people by being around them. He only realised his power at the end of Evil Star when he helped Matt after he was injured by Chaos, the King of the Old Ones. He discovered that during the stay with his carer Sebastian in Ciudad del Veneno, known as Poison Town in English, none of the people around him got sick due to his healing abilities, and when Matt slept at the house where Pedro lived, he noticed his scars from a previous fight had vanished overnight.

He is described as being extremely skinny with long dark brown hair and brown eyes. His past incarnation is named Inti. Pedro is 14 years old in Evil Star and Nightrise, but is then 15 in Necropolis. He had tried to heal Scott after Susan Mortlake tortured him by trying to control him but could not as the scars of the wound were too deep. By the time of Necropolis, he had learned enough of the English language to be able to communicate with the other four gatekeepers.

In Necropolis, he went through the doorway in the Tai Shan Temple along with Scott, and ended up in Italy ten years later. He was held as a prisoner in a castle situated in Naples, along with Scott. After a few weeks of being held in prison, Scott under the influence of the Old Ones joins their side along with Jonas Mortlake, son of Susan Mortlake, while Pedro afterwards escaped the prison and travelled to Rome with the help of an Italian boy named Giovanni. He used the door in St. Peter's Basilica in Rome to get to Oblivion, Antarctica where he and the remaining four finally defeat the Old Ones. After winning the battle, he joins Matt and the other three to live in the dreamworld situated beyond the mountains of Oblivion.

Pedro can communicate with the other four of the five in the dream world.

==== Jamie and Scott Tyler ====
Jamie and Scott Tyler, twins, are two of the Five (Jamie being the de facto third and Scott being the de facto fourth) and are the joint main protagonists in the third book, Nightrise. At the beginning of the novel, Jamie and Scott are working in a dingy theatre in Reno, Nevada, under the whim of their "Uncle Don" who is not really their uncle, but Jamie and Scott are forced to call him that. After a performance, Scott is kidnapped and both physically and mentally tortured by the sinister Nightrise Corporation at a juvenile prison called Silent Creek. Jamie is rescued by a woman called Alicia McGuire and creates a plan to save Scott. Along the way, he is catapulted into the past and witnesses the first battle against the Old Ones. Sapling, Jamie's former self, was killed by the Old Ones, hence he was 'replaced' by Jamie. At the end of the novel Jamie and Scott are united with Matt and Pedro.

Jamie and Scott's power is telepathy and they have the power to control other people and make them abide by the instructions given by the twins, as well as being able to read each other's thoughts automatically. Jamie has shown in Nightrise that he doesn't like using his powers.

The twins are described as being very skinny (to the point of being malnourished) with long black hair (they are Native American) and dark eyes. Both of them have cut their hair by the time they are reunited.

Their past incarnations are Sapling (Jamie) and Flint (Scott). Matt had stated that Scott's past incarnation name, Flint, suited him for Scott had a hard look around him and a type of cruelty. He was supposedly angry when Matt split him and Jamie apart for the twins had never been so far apart. Matt stated that he thought Scott could not be trusted yet. Jamie and Scott are both fourteen years old in Nightrise, but are fifteen in Necropolis. In Necropolis, it shows that Jamie is now more in charge of the two, as Scott is very withdrawn and quiet. Scott also shuts down when in stress. The reason was that he was thoroughly programmed while held captive by the Nightrise agents in Nevada, USA. Nightrise stated at the start of Necropolis that it was possible to turn Scott against his friends.

Scott betrays the Five in the final book; as soon as he and Pedro arrive in Italy, Scott is won over to the Old Ones and has Pedro's finger broken. Scott then joins the Old Ones and is taught by Jonas Mortlake, son of Susan Mortlake, who tortured him. He is given "luxury" in the fortress of Oblivion which seems luxurious, but has a habit of turning to maggot-ridden meat and freezing rooms in seconds. It seems to be connected to whenever he is thinking of grim things. Eventually, he decides to contact Jamie. He summons Matt to the fortress under pretense of repentance, but actually betrays Matt and lets the Old Ones capture him. Scott feels guilty for his actions and when he hears Matt being tortured, he opens the locked door, getting Jamie, Scarlet, and Pedro inside Oblivion, but also sacrificing himself as the lock of the door was protected by a deadly cosmic force equivalent to thousands of volts of electricity. He then dies in Jamie's arms.

They can communicate with each other and the other members of the Five in a dream world.

==== Scarlett Adams ====
Scarlett is the fifth of the Five and is the main protagonist in the fourth book Necropolis. She had a close friend named Aidan (in the books it never claimed to be her boyfriend). Scarlett was found at an orphanage in Indonesia and was adopted by English parents named Paul and Vanessa Adams, who were respectively, an international business law specialist and the head of a holiday company that put together packages in China and the Far East. Her mother is described as tall, blonde and elegant while her father is described as having the looks of a lawyer with greying hair, a round face and glasses. They lived together as a family in Dulwich, near London. She bears a strong resemblance, and is described by some, as Lin Mo, the Chinese goddess of the sea. Scarlett's father Paul works for the Nightrise Corporation, at the end of Nightrise she leaves on a flight to Hong Kong.

Scarlett's power is controlling the weather. Scarlett's power was at first thought to be predicting the weather but is proven that she could also control it when she summons a dragon typhoon to escape after she gets captured. This is also noted in Nightrise as Scar summons a rainstorm to mask Inti's arrival. Scarlett is described as being of average height, slim, and being Asian/Eurasian. She also has long black hair, strange bright green eyes and has the soft brown skin of a girl born in Asia. She is also said to have a dazzling smile, that has gotten her out of trouble on many occasions. Matt also claims that she is very good-looking.

While her parents are out working, Scarlett is taken care of by a Scottish woman, Mrs Christina Murdoch. She is short, dark-haired and seemed to have no sense of humour at all. Scarlett and Mrs Murdoch had agreed silently that they were never going to be friends although they got on well enough.

Scarlett is known to act before she thinks, like when she pushed a teacher (who couldn't swim) fully clothed into the school's swimming pool and almost got killed by a speeding truck only to be saved by one of Lohan's associates. Scarlett is shown as brave throughout Necropolis and Oblivion.

Her past life is name was also Scarlett, but often called "Scar".

At the end of Necropolis, Scarlett is shot in the head by a Nightrise agent. She is then paired with Richard Cole when they went through the door in Tai Shan Temple, and arrives in Egypt ten years later. She is immediately operated upon and soon after, recovered from the bullet wound. Then they went to Dubai with Richard and reached Oblivion via an aeroplane.

She can communicate with the others while she's asleep, in the dreamworld.

=== Richard Cole ===
Richard Cole is a journalist first introduced in Raven's Gate where he helps Matt Freeman out with his troubles with the heartless witch Jayne Deverill. He was a journalist for the Greater Malling Gazette in Greater Malling, Yorkshire, living in York. At the end of the novel Richard pushes Deverill in a pool of radioactive acid when she tries to strangle Matt.

In the second novel, Evil Star, Richard left his job as a journalist for the Greater Malling Gazette and worked on another newspaper, The Gipton Echo. He agrees to go to Peru with Matt and gets separated from Matt when their taxi from the airport was ambushed by the Incas, who were actually preventing them from being captured by the police. He stays at Vilcabamba, the lost city of the Incas, and reunites with Matt who went to the Nazca Lines to find the second gate. The Incas gifted him a tumi, a sacrificial sword which possesses an ancient magic thus making the sword visible only to him, but with a warning that when the time would come to use it he would regret it.

He does not appear much in Nightrise, though he does appear briefly. But in Necropolis, he makes a bigger appearance when he goes with Matt and Jamie to London to try to find Scarlett Adams, the last of the Five, and then goes to Hong Kong with them via Macau before they are attacked and separated. He reunites with the Five at the Tai Shan Temple. He is then paired with Scarlett when he went through the door in the Tai Shan Temple.

In Oblivion, Richard and a severely-injured Scarlett arrive through the door under the pyramids in Egypt. However, due to the ten years that had passed because of the door's malfunction, the country is now engulfed in a civil war between the military government dominated by the Old Ones and a group of freedom fighters led and funded by the Nexus. He later encounters a teen girl named Holly, who Jamie met at St Boltoph's in England. When Matt is captured and tortured by the Old Ones due to Scott's betrayal, Richard stabs Matt with the tumi, to provide him with a swift death, thus enabling his past self to replace him. Richard and Holly help the Gatekeepers defeat the Old Ones in the battle at Oblivion; and after the departure of the Five, they return to England and live as neighbours. The Gatekeepers return to the Dreamworld to live, and Richard and Holly wait for their chance to permanently live there.

At university Richard studied journalism, politics and the history of geography. In Necropolis, his knowledge of historical maps helped him to decode St Joseph's diary and find out where the Gatekeeper's portals are.

=== The Librarian ===
The Librarian is a very mysterious character, first appearing in Necropolis. He is first introduced when Matt explores the Dreamworld and in the process discovers and enters a Library. The Librarian, as his name suggests, is the master of the Library, which he calls "the Great Library." The motive of the Librarian is obscure; he simply seems to catalogue and record the lives of every being which has ever lived. He has a collection of the lives of all the humans on Earth, in the form of books which record "their beginnings, their marriages, their good days and their bad days, their deaths - of course. Everything they ever did." The Librarian knows all about the Gatekeepers, and is seemingly there to help them combat the Old Ones, although when questioned, he often gives vague and obscure answers. Such is his power that he may in fact be the opposite of Chaos, the King of the Old Ones.

Physically, the Librarian appears as a short, elderly man, (barely five foot high) with white robes, a silk red jacket, with gray hair, gray eyes and a face which looks as if it has been carved. He looks like an Arab. A beard would suit him but he is clean-shaven.

At the end of the fifth and final novel, Oblivion, the victorious Gatekeepers return to the Dreamworld and all enter the Library. The Librarian appears, yet he has a woman with him this time. To all the Gatekeepers she resembles their races. So to Jamie and Scott, she appears Native American; to Scarlett, she is Asian, to Pedro, she is Incan, and to Matt, she is his mother, as she was on the day of her death. All this suggests the Librarian is also Matt's father, and thus the father of the Five Gatekeepers.

=== The Traveller ===
The Traveller, aka Graham Fletcher, is a protagonist in book five, Oblivion. He came to Holly's village from the ruins of London on a house boat, which made Holly think he was a gypsy. He was said to work for government before London blew up. He had an authoritative air about him, which got him out of trouble in numerous occasions in the village. He became half-accepted as one of the villagers, thanks to his alcohol on the houseboat and his horse, which he reluctantly allowed the hungry villagers to eat. The Traveller was present when Jamie finally came out of the door in the church having left it ten years. The Traveller protected Jamie from the Council handing him over to the evil police. But when Miss Keyland betrayed everyone and sold out the village to police, the Traveller sought out Jamie and took him out. He reluctantly bought Holly too, only saving her when he thought he could help himself. He took Holly and Jamie down to London's ruins, and then they met with the Nexus, revealing who the Traveller really was. The Traveller said his real name was Graham Fletcher and he had a brother in the Nexus, whom he hadn't seen or heard from in ten years. So, the Traveller, Holly and Jamie went into the Nexus and met Susan Ashwood, the medium. The Traveller then said he would take Jamie to London, to Saint Merediths, which had a door he could get to Antarctica in. Holly came too. The Traveller killed Eleanor Straike in London, who was an evil policewoman who had killed all of Holly's village and also Little Moulsford village. The Traveller stayed behind in London when the others went through the door. He won the battle and saw to his surprise the police just gave up on the attack when Straike was dead. He later went back with Holly and Richard, and married Sophie from his surviving group.

=== The Nexus ===
The Nexus is a highly secret group of powerful and influential people with some link to the supernatural world who prevent the Old Ones re-entering planet Earth. They tell Matt that he is one of the Gatekeepers in Raven's Gate and help Matt and Pedro with the gate's whereabouts in Evil Star. In Nightrise, only one member of the Nexus, Natalie Johnson, appears near the end of the book. She helps Jamie and Scott Tyler escape after a near assassination of a presidential candidate in Auburn, California.

There are always twelve members in the Nexus. However, in Raven's Gate one of them, Professor Sanjay Dravid, is killed by a pterosaur and in Evil Star, Fabian, another member of the Nexus, is shot by Captain Rodriguez of the Peruvian police service.

The leaders of the Nexus are:

- Susan Ashwood, a blind medium who is also the daughter of author Elizabeth Ashwood, who wrote about Raven's Gate, black magic and witchcraft. She is the de facto leader of the group, and the one who believes most strongly in the Gatekeepers.
- Nathalie Johnson, who owns a computer empire and is described as the "female Bill Gates." She is Susan's most trusted confidant, and provides support to Jamie during Nightrise.
- Professor Sanjay Dravid, who was murdered by the witches in Raven's Gate.
- Harry Foster, an Australian who owns a newspaper empire operating internationally. He is about forty years old and is most prominent in Necropolis, where he proposes several strategies to sneak the Gatekeepers into Hong Kong.
- David Tarrant, who is a senior police officer in New Scotland Yard, London, ranked as Assistant Commissioner. He supplies Matt and Richard with false passports in Evil Star and bodyguards (who are murdered) in Necropolis.
- Mr Lee is a perceptive Chinese businessman who has many connections in Hong Kong, including members of the Triads.
- Mr Danton, who is French and is connected with Military intelligence, possibly the DGSE
- Fabian, a Peruvian author who formally recruits Matt and Richard at the end of the first book. He acts as their primary handler in Evil Star, but betrays Matt, Pedro and the Nexus due to believing that Chaos can't be beaten.
- A German woman (unnamed) who is involved in politics
- An unnamed senator in the American Democratic Party who never speaks during any of the group's meetings.
- A fourth female leader who never speaks or receives a name.
- An unnamed man who replaces Fabian
- Albert Remy, a Frenchman who is stationed in the Egyptian desert guarding a door in the pyramids, and is rewarded after ten years when Scarlett and Richard get through. He protects them, taking them to Dubai, but is killed on the way by enemy soldiers and dies in their jeep. He replaces Dravid between the first two books, but is only named in Oblivion.
- A Christian bishop, of unnamed denomination, who seems to be very sceptical about the existence of the Old Ones throughout the first book, but seems convinced of their malignant presence afterward.

The Nexus has two aims:

1) Protect and assist the Gatekeepers and the world, observing possible supernatural events which would hint of the Old Ones; and, 2) supply the Gatekeepers with weapons, provisions and help from surviving government agents and contact the Five after their return

The Nexus presumably disbands after the final battle, as the Five leave Earth and are no longer required. This could be said for the Nexus too. They presumably go back to their normal lives.

=== Superintendent Stephen Mallory ===
A black superintendent who appears solely in Raven's Gate, Mallory is in charge of interviewing Matthew Freeman after the police arrest him on suspicion of murder. Mallory interviews both Matthew and his partner-in-crime Kelvin, and although Kelvin claims Matthew started the whole theft and "killed" a policeman, Mallory also interviews the police officer who Kelvin claimed was dead, and from him learns that Matthew, although involved, was innocent as he wanted to save the guard. Mallory is puzzled as to why Matthew should have become a criminal, as to him Matthew seems very polite, intelligent, and moral, unlike the other thugs he usually deals with. Mallory is suspicious of Matthew's foster-mother, Jayne Deverill, from the beginning, and his suspicions about her deepen when he learns of the "suicide" of a criminal near his police center and feels Jayne Deverill was involved. He learns about Matthew's precognitive powers from his neighbour, and then learns of another death reported by Matthew. He immediately feels Matthew is in immediate danger from Jayne Deverill and visits Matthew on the farm, but Jayne Deverill is openly hostile to Mallory. Mallory tells Jayne Deverill that she is unfit for guardianship and that he is removing Matthew from her. He tells Matthew that within a day he will return and rescue him, but on the way home, his radio breaks and picks up a faint EVP. Mallory tries to change channel, but all the channels have the same EVP. Now frightened, Mallory can't slow down. His car speeds up and hurtles him off a bridge into a lorry which both explode, killing the superintendent.

Later, it is revealed that Mallory's death was orchestrated by the cult of villagers from Lesser Malling, as he stood in their way to kill Matthew.

=== Tom Burgess ===
Tom Burgess is a farmer who works at Lesser Malling. He has his own farm, which is a stark contrast to Jayne Deverill's farm; Matt notes how clean and welcoming it is. Tom first appears when Jayne Deverill has sent Matt to buy a potion from the chemist and he initially appears menacing; he grabs Matt's shoulder and tells him Matt shouldn't be in the village and warns him to get out immediately, and says Matt is in danger. Matt is confused but becomes more unnerved when he hears noises at the local power station, Omega One, which is derelict, at night. Matt stumbles upon the power station in the woods the next day and bumps into Tom Burgess when he, Matt, is hopelessly lost. Tom tells him again he should leave, and begins to tell Matt about the black magic being conducted in the town. Tom Burgess then goes mad with fear and shoots Asmodeus, Jayne Deverill's cat, dead, knowing it is spying on them. Tom Burgess tells Matt to come to his farm the next day at nine in the morning and together they will leave. Tom then gives Matt a necklace with an image of a key engraved in stone, saying it will undo the black magic which keeps Matt from finding the right path. To Matt's surprise, this symbol does unlock the black magic. Matt has more nightmares that night but arrives at Tom Burgess' farm the next morning as Tom Burgess told him to, but despite the attractive, welcoming outer exterior of the farmhouse, the interior is a mess, as if a whirlwind has hit it. Soon, Matt finds Tom Burgess dead in his bedroom, his legs bent and broken. This is also where Matt first finds out about Raven's Gate, as Tom has scrawled it on the wall in green paint. Matt rushes out and soon finds some police, who soon begin to doubt him when they find the place neat and tidy again and several workers and one of the witches from the village doing housekeeping. The police threaten to arrest Matt again if he continues telling them stories like this. The next night, Jayne Deverill arranges for a phone call for Matt, and he is immensely disturbed to hear the dead farmer, Tom Burgess, on the other end.

=== Atoc ===
Atoc was an Inca who successfully saved Matt and Pedro multiple times. Later, he flies a helicopter over the Nazca desert along with Pedro and Matt to find Salamanda's base and prevent the rise of the evil star and opening of the Old Ones' gate. However, he dies after the helicopter crashes due to an attack by bullets.

Strangely, though he was seen dead by both Matt and Pedro, he later reappears in the final book, Oblivion, in which before the final battle begins, Richard sees Atoc wave to him, then disappear in the snowstorm. Although Anthony Horowitz confirmed it to be an error.

=== The Incas ===
The Incas appear in Evil Star when Matt and Pedro travel to the Inca City Vilacamba in Peru. They also appear in Necropolis where they fight the zombies destroying Professor Chambers' hacienda.

=== The Native Americans ===
The Native Americans aid Jamie in Nightrise by rescuing him from Silent Creek prison. A Native American by the name of Joe Feather has said that Jamie and Scott have Native blood in their veins, and that the tribes of America will always be ready to help the Five. When Jamie is injured by security guards at Silent Creek an Indian shaman revives him at the camp where Feather's tribe live.

=== Alicia McGuire ===
Alicia McGuire is a black woman with dark hair and is involved with politics, being an advisor to Senator John Trelawney before her son Danny was kidnapped. When she lost her son she chose to leave her job although Senator Trelawney allowed her a stipend while not working. She is stated to have looked all over the state for Danny and contacted everyone she could. Finally she found an enormous corporation, Nightrise and then she managed to contact them but found out they were responsible for Danny's abduction. She had been looking up on missing children all year and finally found a pattern in the abductions, linking them with the Nightrise Corporation.

Later on she heard about the psychic twins, Scott and Jamie, and went to a production to see them in person. She stood up in the middle of the act, asking them if they really were psychic, and asked Scott where her son was, she held up a picture of Danny. Scott looked into Alicia's mind and said yes, Danny was alive, but he was suffering and it was Alicia's fault. Later on, Nightrise came for Scott and Jamie, but they only got Scott. Alicia came up and rescued Jamie, foiling Nightrise by making them unable to get her number plate. But they framed Jamie for killing his step parents.

Alicia became Jamie's de-facto guardian. They met up with Senator John Trelawney, who used his influence to place Jamie into the Silent Creek Facility so he could rescue Scott and Danny but found that Scott was in a more private sector of Nighrise. Jamie then broke out only with Danny, and then they reunited Danny with Alicia. Jamie realized his dream prophecies meant that John Trelawney would be killed by Scott at his hometown on his party, so he told Alicia and they raced to the town Auburn to save Trelawney, but Scott ignored Jamie even with telepathy and so Jamie got a security guard to shoot the assassin, Susan Mortlake, and thus saved Trelawney. Then Alicia took Jamie and Scott away from there but the police tracked them down. She got them away and let Jamie and Scott go but then the police turned up and questioned Alicia. Alicia saved Jamie and Scott by saying she had never met them and demanded to talk to Trelawney, and thus we can assume had had better things to do than not let her off.

=== Han Shan-tung ===
Also known as "The Master of the Mountain", Han Shan-tung is the leader of the Chinese Triad White Lotus Society, first appearing in Necropolis. Matt and Jamie along with Richard Cole are guests in his household in Necropolis, but over dinner he tells them that he can smuggle them into Hong Kong, ( which is where Scarlet is being held captive) but only if Matt can prove he is one of the Five, as he claims to be. The test Han Shan Tung has in mind is a sword ladder- a series of razor sharp blades strung together on wires creating 19 steps up to a balcony. Although Richard begs him not to, Matt goes into a self-induced trance and is able to climb the ladder without injury apart from a cut in his palm that had been the result of a false start. Han Shan Tung seems surprised that Matt actually succeeded and agrees to find them a passage into Hong Kong by ship.

=== Lohan ===
White Lotus Society Triad member and son of Han Shan-tung, Lohan is responsible for saving Scarlett from the shape-changers and the Nightrise Corporation. He sent the bugged jade necklace given to Scarlett on an aeroplane to Australia in the hopes of luring the Old Ones away. He then found Richard and Jamie, and set up the operation to break Matt and Scarlett out of Victoria Prison.

At the end of Necropolis when all of the Gatekeepers and their supporters were separated, he was paired with Matt and went to Belem, Brazil, and later flew himself and Matt to Oblivion.

He had the rank of "Incense Master" in the White Lotus Society and was well trained in martial arts, piloting planes etc. Scarlett and Matt describe him as a cold-blooded killer who killed anyone who got in his way, as he was used to this in his previous job in the White Lotus Society.

=== Professor Joanna Chambers ===
Professor Joanna Chambers is an expert on the history, geography and culture of Peru and the Nazca lines, introduced in Evil Star. She helps Matt, Pedro and Richard with their exploration of Peru for the second gate, and later they stay at her "Hacienda" (Farm)

In Nightrise she does not appear significantly, but in Necropolis she makes a more important appearance. She has been looking after Richard and the male Gatekeepers for four months and celebrates them leaving as they have constantly interrupted her research. However they are attacked by a small army of zombies who destroy her house and wound her. She later on dies of internal bleeding.

=== Senator John Trelawny ===
Senator John Trelawny is Alicia McGuire's boss and one of the two main candidates for the presidency of the United States along with Charles Baker. While Baker has the support of the Nightrise Corporation, Trelawny is young, popular and charismatic and is in the lead for the presidency.

He helps Jamie Tyler get into the Silent Creek prison and is also investigating Nightrise for several stories of corruption. He is the target of Susan Mortlake's plan and is nearly assassinated by one of his guards who is under Scott Tyler's control. Jamie uses his own power to save the senator.

It is later revealed that Trelawny lost the election possibly due to rigged votes. A vast majority of Americans are very displeased by Trelawny's defeat and took to the streets to denounce what they believe was a fraudulent election.

=== Commander David Cain ===
Commander David Cain, LOM, Bronze Star Medal, is the commanding officer on the US naval sixth fleet ship USS Pole Star. After leaving his base in Florida, he travelled south to Antarctica, where he nominates himself as leader of the World Army, a ragtag group of survivors with the sole aim of defeating the Old Ones. However his time in charge of the World Army is not a success, and though meaning well, ends up killing half of his troops with a failed attack on the fortress where Chaos and the Old Ones are based.

In the aftermath, he becomes Vice President of the United States.

== Antagonists ==
=== The Old Ones ===
The Old Ones are a group of demonic creatures that the Five will one day battle in the present day. They were defeated for the first time by the Gatekeepers when they were all together ten thousand years before. The Old Ones are led by a creature called Chaos, who first appears in Raven's Gate as the primary antagonist, alongside Sir Michael Marsh and Jayne Deverill, who were working for Chaos. Chaos was the cause of the near-destruction of Earth before the Dark Ages where Jamie Tyler is catapulted to in Nightrise, where he meets the Old Ones in their previous forms. The forms that the Old Ones take towards the end of Evil Star are deformed and monstrous creatures which centre mainly on the creatures in the Nazca Lines in Peru. The Old Ones are capable of finding people who share the same views as them and giving them extra powers and plans for world destruction. However, at the end it is revealed that those people cannot destroy the world themselves - they have to die with the rest of humanity, because humanity is doomed and the Old Ones are the true masters of destruction. The Old Ones make an appearance in both Evil Star and Nightrise, although in Nightrise their presence is mainly due to the flashback wherein the Gatekeepers eradicate them. Despite these brief appearances, the Old Ones are the primary antagonists in the whole The Power of Five series, and their influence is felt throughout the series.

The Old Ones first appear in Chapter 15 of Raven's Gate, mentioned by Professor Sanjay Dravid of the Nexus. The Nexus has been created to combat the Old Ones, and make sure the world remains safer whilst the Old Ones are kept in their prison. The only Old One to make a physical appearance in this book is Chaos, who attempts to escape from Raven's Gate with the assistance of the witches of Lesser Malling and the human antagonist, Sir Michael Marsh. Chaos kills Marsh when he comes out of his prison, taking the form of a huge black creature with webbed fingers. Chaos is then pulled back into Raven's Gate by radiation when the nuclear reactor beneath the Gate explodes and then he is not seen again until the events of Evil Star, where another Gate is opening, this time in Peru.

The Old Ones' presence is felt throughout Evil Star, but only at the end are they actually seen in physical form. The four main creatures in the Old Ones' army are a giant hummingbird, a massive condor, a giant spider, and a huge monkey, based on the Nazca Lines, the second gate. There are also thirteen fire riders who form the Old Ones' cavalry, and several other deformed creatures: a huge toad with the head of a bird, an alligator on legs, a pig the size of a horse, and several strange, ethereal creatures. They also seem to possess an army of soldiers made up of flies. The Old Ones escape from their prison and meet two Gatekeepers, Pedro and Matt Freeman. Pedro is unable to confront them due to an injury caused by a plane crash. Matt tries to fend off the Old Ones, and almost wins, but he realizes that he doesn't have enough power for he is one of the Five and all of them are needed to defeat the Old Ones. Matt falls unconscious allowing the Old Ones to escape led by Chaos. Just like the Old Ones possessed giant dogs in Raven's Gate (although these could have been created by Jayne Deverill as none of the Old Ones had been released yet), in this book they possess several giant condors, which guard the Gate in the Nazca Desert, thus explaining the Inca's prophecy: "The birds fly where they should not fly."

In Nightrise, the Old Ones have escaped. They are assisting Nightrise Corporation in order to find the Gatekeepers, and Nightrise discover two: Jamie and Scott Tyler, separately capturing both. Diego Salamanda had died, and failed to capture Matt and Pedro, and Nightrise is also trying to look for them, in addition the fifth Gatekeeper, Scarlett Adams, appears in the past when Jamie Tyler is shot while escaping the prison Silent Creek, dying temporarily and going back to the past, where he replaces his previous incarnation, Sapling, in order to destroy the Old Ones. The Old Ones rule the world in the past, and they seem invincible, to the point of actually killing a Gatekeeper. However, they don't know that when a gatekeeper dies he is replaced by his future self, and so they ignore the fact that Jamie has replaced Sapling. A brief battle follows with the Old Ones in which the Gatekeepers meet up and defeat the Old Ones, expelling them to another dimension. After this, two Gates are built to keep them out: one in the future Peru and one in the future Yorkshire, where the first battle was fought. However, they break out in Evil Star, which Jamie sees in his dreams in Silent Creek Prison.

In Necropolis, the Old Ones have seized control of Hong Kong in China, as this is where the ultimate headquarters of the Nightrise Corporation is situated. From Hong Kong, the Old Ones are spreading a fascist government across the world, commencing their new empire. Anyone who criticizes the government is eliminated, and anyone who informs people about the possession of Hong Kong also dies. In other words, the Old Ones have seized control of Hong Kong, and are possessing multitudes of its civilians, from the government to the police and the street cleaners, and swathes of others. As the main plan of the Old Ones is to destroy humanity, they are slowly killing off all the surviving inhabitants of Hong Kong - the inhabitants who have not criticized the government or informed their relatives of the new regime - by infecting the atmosphere with a poisonous gas which resembles green acid, and this slowly sucks the life out of the living inhabitants. In Necropolis, the Old Ones have discovered the Fifth of the Gatekeepers: Scarlett Adams. They now need to trap her in Hong Kong, their city, and lure the other Gatekeepers into the same trap. This they succeed in doing, only to have the Gatekeepers escape at the last moment and Scarlett creating a typhoon which ultimately destroys Hong Kong, the Necropolis. Once the Old Ones have separated the Gatekeepers, they leave Hong Kong, presumably to Antarctica, where Chaos, the King of the Old Ones, has made his base in an ice palace.

In Oblivion, the Old Ones have, in essence, conquered the entire planet, which is set ten years after Necropolis; thus, assuming Raven's Gate is in 2005, places Oblivion in 2018. Chaos, King of the Old Ones, has made his base in Antarctica in a massive stone-ice palace called Oblivion, and he has sent his armies of Old Ones out onto the world to kill and enslave people. The human armies fight back with firepower but most of them are defeated and Chaos ensures that corrupt politicians and billionaire magnates get all the luxury and money and slaves they want. So the world is a complete wreck (hence the King's name, Chaos) and meanwhile, the Gatekeepers, Richard Cole and Lohan have been trapped in time during the decade the Old Ones have conquered the world. Finally, at the end of the ten years, the Gatekeepers are freed, but, as they had no fixed destination, they ended up separated in different countries: Jamie is in England, Matt and Lohan are in South America, Scott and Pedro are in North America and Scarlett and Richard are in Africa. All countries have evil presidents, who enslave any rebels. There is a global war going on with rebellions and fascists, and the Old Ones are preparing to kill off everyone else. This is the Third World War that Nathalie Johnson mentioned. The rebels go off to the South Pole to blow up the Old Ones with a missile and aerial bombardment, but this is all an illusion. Chaos has fooled everyone and his fortress Oblivion is really fine. The Old Ones all run out and kill everyone, but then the Gatekeepers band together and stab Chaos' heart, killing him seemingly forever, and banishing him and his followers into the other dimensional Hell.

=== Jayne Deverill ===
Jayne Deverill is Matt Freeman's foster parent when he is sent on the L.E.A.F. project after robbing a warehouse. She is, along with Sir Michael Marsh, the main antagonist in book one, Raven's Gate.

She lives in a remote village named Lesser Malling just outside the Yorkshire Moors. The village is very much far away from everything altogether the village has just a very small centre where there is only a pond, a pub, a sweet shop and a chemist. It also has an unnatural forest.

Deverill has her own farm named Hive Hall. She is described as having wrinkled skin, lifeless eyes, and white hair. At the end of the novel it is revealed she is an evil, heartless witch.

She dies at the end, when she is pushed into a pool of radioactive acid underneath a power plant by Richard Cole after she attempts to kill Matt.

Mrs Deverill has a cat named Asmodeus who cannot die.

=== Sir Michael Marsh ===
Sir Michael Marsh is, along with Jayne Devrill, the main antagonist of Raven's Gate. The mastermind behind the government's Omega One project, he was knighted by the Queen for his services.

Along with the witches of Lesser Malling (of whom he is the leader), he is planning to use nuclear power and black magic as well as Matt's blood to open Raven's Gate and release the Old Ones. He fails to kill Matt but manages to get enough of his blood to release Chaos, the King of the Old Ones.

However, the powerful demon kills Marsh as soon as he is released before being dragged back into the Gate by Omega One's radioactive pull.

=== Chaos ===
Chaos is the King of the Old Ones and is the main antagonist of the entire series. The King was not actually named Chaos, but the ancient human resistance gave him that name, due to his motivations. Chaos seeks to destroy humanity and conquer the Earth, in doing so reshaping the Earth in his own dark, poisonous image. If he could have succeeded ten thousand years ago, Chaos would have reduced the world to an empty swamp. Even though Chaos has been thrown from the world by the power of Five, his influence still remains throughout the human race.

Chaos' power seems to be vast, as he is able to stretch black clouds around the Earth to block out the Sun and prevent life from growing properly. Chaos is able to fill the oceans with junk, and he had almost succeeded in eliminating humanity, reducing it down to ten thousand people by the time Jamie Tyler arrived. Even before his banishment, Chaos made sure there were other people whom he had seduced to carry out his sinister mission, so his plan would not be forgotten. Eventually the descendants of these people formed the evil Nightrise Corporation, whose sole purpose was to free Chaos and assist him in dominating the planet once again.

Chaos appears to be a shape-shifter and a master manipulator, as he was able to gain several humans to his side before betraying them and revealing that they have to die too. In the past, ten thousand years back, Chaos was human-size, and looked very human, except he had no face, and resembled a black shadow. When he broke out of Raven's Gate (briefly) in Lesser Malling, he was approximately two hundred feet high, as high as the power station. After he had broken out of the Gate in Peru, he was approximately fifty thousand feet high - high enough to touch the clouds. Chaos breaks out of the Gate in Peru, and then he and the Old Ones shape shift into two burning suns, after Chaos has punched out Matt. Chaos just looks at Matt unconscious and half dead and then melts into the night, enfolding it round him.

Chaos observes the events of Necropolis from his palace, Oblivion, in the South Pole of Antarctica, a palace he has made for him and his Old Ones. He plans the destruction of humanity and the domination of the world by electing an evil man, Charles Baker, to become president of the United States of America and thus ensuring that he will start a fascist dictatorship and eventually cause World War Three. Chaos' plan succeeded, but his headquarters of Hong Kong was destroyed (by a Gatekeeper, Scarlett, when she realized her power). But the loss of Hong Kong meant nothing to Chaos, so he gathered his army and ordered them to start the war and "it is time for the end of the world to begin", so he sends his agents out to the world to kill everyone. Chaos gives power to billionaires and evil politicians and ensures the world becomes worse, with the return of slavery, public murder and war. Chaos tells everyone who survives that if they come to Antarctica, they will win easy. Matt Freeman, Chaos' rival, knows this is a lie. So although Matt warns everyone, the resistance goes to the South Pole anyway, and Chaos creates an illusion of his palace being an easy target, causing the resistance to blow it up, but then Chaos cunningly reveals the palace perfectly fine. All his armies rush out to kill everyone and very nearly succeed. However, although Chaos managed to convert Scott to his side, he did not count on his repentance, nor Richard Cole working out the tumi knife, and Richard kills Matt, and Scott sacrifices himself with his repentance, and then Scott and Matt are returned from the past to kill Chaos. Chaos is surrounded by the Five, and they impale his heart with their blades, and this finally kills the evil demon Chaos, sending his ashy remains into Hell.

=== Diego Salamanda ===
Diego Salamanda is the main antagonist in Evil Star. Salamanda's main purpose is to get the diary belonging to St Joseph of Córdoba, because he knows this will gain him supernatural powers, and he auctions for it in London and pays an enormous sum of money to tempt William Morton, the book owner. However, he has Fabian kill Morton when he has the chance and steals the diary. He is fat.

He has three main bases: one not far from Lima, another in the desert up by Nazca, and another in the desert itself, where he finally operates the satellite which is the title object of the book.

Salamanda is one of the victims of an ancient ritual which requires squeezing a "special" baby's head from birth so it looks abnormally deformed. Even Pedro, who is used to deformity and disease, calls Salamanda a "freak", and also says he was "evil" and says Salamanda makes him "want to be sick."

Diego Salamanda, as it is revealed in Nightrise, is an agent of the Nightrise Corporation, and this explains why he wants to hunt down the Gatekeepers, in order to allow the Old Ones to be released. Diego Salamanda also employs the traitor Fabian, from the Nexus organization. Diego Salamanda pursues Matt and Pedro through the entire book, and he doesn't seem to let Matt's disguises barricade him from his mission: he straightaway knows that Matt and Pedro are the Gatekeepers when he sees them in his farmhouse, because he says he can "feel their presence."

Diego Salamanda also seems to have a good understanding of astronomy, because he knows about the lacking star Cygnus that will open the gate in Nazca and therefore he is replacing the star with his own satellite - the evil star of the title.

Diego Salamanda tries to kill Matt with a pistol, but in a final use of his powers, Matt thrusts the bullets away but two bounce back at Salamanda, who gets hit by the bullets in the chest and dies when he falls.

=== Captain Rodriguez ===
Captain Rodriguez is a secondary antagonist in Evil Star. At first he was an ordinary policeman, but when Diego Salamanda takes over the police, Rodriguez becomes his head of security at the base in Nazca. Later, he kills Fabian there and attempts to kill Matt too. Before he can, the Incas blow up the radio tower and the tip falls on him and kills him

=== Fabian ===
Fabian is a secondary antagonist in Evil Star. He is originally a member of the Nexus, but he betrays them to help Diego Salamanda, whom he used to work with. He is controlling the Evil Star at the Nazca base. He is shot when he tries to stop Captain Rodriguez from killing Matt. After Captain Rodriguez is crushed (see Captain Rodriguez), it is revealed that Fabian survived. He tells Matt and Richard that Salamanda is controlling the satellite from his van in the desert. He then dies from his wounds.

=== Nightrise Corporation ===
The Nightrise Corporation is a group trying to resurrect the Old Ones so they can have power in the new world. They are the primary antagonists of Nightrise and Necropolis, and are one of the major antagonists of Oblivion.

The Nightrise Corporation consists of:

- The Chairman (acting chairman)
- Colton Banes (high-ranking official)
- Max Koring (Silent Creek prison boss)
- Kyle Hovey (under Banes, presumably lower-ranking)
- Susan Mortlake (deputy of the chairman, very high-ranking)
- Jonas Mortlake (CEO, 10 years later, in Oblivion)
- Simms (possibly in charge of Nightrise military)
- Diego Salamanda (in charge of Nightrise's Peruvian political empire)
- Paul Adams (Scarlett Adams's adopted father, a double agent, sells her to the chairman)
- Audrey Cheng (a shape-changer in human form)
- Karl (another shape-changer in human form)
- Sir Michael Marsh (it is suspected he may have been connected with Nightrise due to his political influence)

All the above members of Nightrise are deceased, except Max Koring, who is arrested and Karl, who may have returned to Oblivion, the stronghold of the Old Ones, with the rest of the Old Ones.

Nightrise has a motto: ja sakkath, jak sakkakh, ja sha xul. It is mentioned that Nightrise has offices all over the world, in every country, and its offices deal with "just about everything." Alicia McGuire even got in touch with a Nightrise office after her son Daniel was kidnapped, believing they could help her, but then discovered they were the culprits behind his theft. It is mentioned that in a Nightrise tower, the more prominent officials have offices much higher up than those on the lower levels, so, literally, the high-ranking officials are the highest-ranking.

Nightrise has two goals:

- To imprison a maximum of three Gatekeepers, thus preventing their full power from maximizing and destroying the Old Ones
- Free the Old Ones and aid them in their conquest of the world

After the destruction of Hong Kong, the condition of Nightrise Corporation is unknown.

In Oblivion, it is revealed Nightrise has survived the Hong Kong typhoon and they've also 'added so many strings to its bow that there was barely anywhere where it wasn't top of its game'.

After the events of Oblivion, it was stated that "...every last evil thing was gone... " when the Gatekeepers banished the Old Ones, and so it may be assumed that the Nightrise workers may also have been banished along with the Old Ones, leading to the end of the Corporation.

=== Susan Mortlake ===
Susan Mortlake is the main antagonist of book three, Nightrise. She is a member of the Nightrise Corporation and manipulates Scott in order to make her plan work to successfully control an armed guard's mind and make him shoot Senator John Trelawney and make Senator Charles Baker become president of the United States, who supports the Old Ones' return. She takes Scott to a juvenile prison centre called Silent Creek. Mortlake is the woman who organized the attempt to kidnap Jamie and Scott, which half-failed, so she ordered one of their attackers, Colton Banes, to strangle his partner Kyle Hovey.

Mortlake is obviously the counterpart to Susan Ashwood, one of the members of the Nexus, although Mortlake has also probably been given power by the Old Ones, as she is pale for a human and she also has a long neck, similar to Salamanda, and very short gray hair. Mortlake works in Los Angeles and she is one of the chief executives of Nightrise, probably under the chairman, whom she takes orders from. The chairman briefly considers her resignation after her plan fails, but the chairman lets her stay on the board.

Mortlake arranges for John Trelawney to be shot, which is why she wants to twist Scott's mind: to make him able to shoot Trelawney by telepathically communicating with one of Trelawney's men. Susan Mortlake almost succeeds in accomplishing this plan, by blocking Scott's mind from other people's minds, so when Jamie tries to contact his brother's mind, he is blocked out. However, Jamie contacts Trelawney's henchman, and, at the last moment, directs him to shoot Susan Mortlake instead. This act is described as 'the most terrible order' of Jamie's life.

=== Jonas Mortlake ===
Jonas Mortlake is the son of Susan and is so self-obsessed with ambition that he doesn't even pay respect to his mother when she is shot. He is centered around business; he cares for nobody and he is also a heavy misogynist. In fact he forms no relationships. When he recruits Scott (as opposed to adoption) he only thinks of killing Scott after the Old Ones win (only, however, after having suffered the humiliation of having to break his own finger. Scott telepathically ordered Jonas to break his own finger). Jonas is only concerned about the Old Ones winning and how much service he can give them. He leaps at the chairman's order to go to Italy because there is Scott Tyler, the boy his mother experimented on. Jonas continues his mother's experiments but is warned that if he fails he will be "adjusted" - which means to have his limbs cut off and replaced with weapons. Knowing that his life of relative luxury depends on it, he furiously works to convert Scott to the Old One's side and corrupt him. In this regard, he succeeds, however only temporarily. But, when Scott is regretting abandoning his brother and betraying his friends, Jonas approaches him from behind and attempts to kill him. On the verge of killing Scott, having neutralized Scott's ability by kicking him in the head, he is suddenly killed by Lohan, who sticks a knife through his shoulders, saving Scott at the last second.

His character is rather similar to Barty Crouch Jr. in the Harry Potter series.

=== Colton Banes ===
Colton Banes is a secondary antagonist in Nightrise. At the beginning of the novel, he and his partner, Kyle Hovey (whom he despises), are sent by Susan Mortlake to capture Scott and Jamie Tyler. After a chase across the Reno circus, Jamie escapes thanks to a woman named Alicia McGuire but Scott is captured. After their failure, they frame Jamie as the murderer of his guardian Don and his wife Marcie whom they both kill. When confronted by Susan Mortlake over the failure of their mission, Hovey tries to put the blame on Banes. However, Mortlake orders Banes to kill Hovey as there was no place for the weak in Nightrise.

Banes is apparently promoted after this as he is seated in an office on one of Nightrise's high floors when Jamie Tyler comes to get the location of his brother. Later, after Jamie escaped him, Banes gets a message from Max Koring, the chief guardian at Silent Creek prison that he was holding Jamie. Banes headed to the prison intending on having his revenge on Jamie. However, as soon as he arrives, the Native Americans attack Silent Creek and Jamie escapes. However, Banes shoots him in the back during this time, sending Jamie into a short coma-like state. Banes is killed shortly after by an arrow, shot by an Indian.

=== Sheik Rasheed al Tamim ===
Rasheed is Sheikh of the United Arab Emirates in Oblivion when Scarlett and Richard arrive. He is corrupt and spoilt, feeds off poverty, and steals wealth. He spends all his time at the casino, gambling and finding young girls. Scarlett challenges him to a gamble at roulette and she wins, to his surprise, prompting him to have the game cancelled and the casino closed for the night. Rasheed takes her back to his palace and tries to seduce her, intent on forcing her to marry him. But later on, his wife Jaheda is disgusted and arranges for Richard and Scarlett to escape along with Larry Carter, a pilot who was being imprisoned. She says that her husband is dangerous and would kill them if he captured them again.

=== The Chairman ===
The Chairman of the Nightrise Corporation is a mysterious man, he is very vain and has a great fear of boats (when he was twelve, a fortune teller told him he'd be killed in an accident involving a boat). He has obviously spent lots of money trying to make himself look younger and he has long white hair which looks like a wig but is in fact his own. The chairman, like the President, prefers to be addressed as `Mr Chairman` and he lives in Hong Kong, in the town of Kowloon, which means `Nine Dragons.`

The chairman constantly maintains contact with his executives throughout the world, and, as he is such a mysterious character, he only appears twice in Nightrise: once in which he is talking to the executives of Nightrise and Diego Salamanda, where it is revealed Salamanda is the chairman's agent in Peru. Salamanda says the Gatekeepers he is pursuing will be in his clutches soon and the chairman is pleased. He appears again when Susan Mortlake rings up to say she plans to have John Trelawney assassinated by using one of the Gatekeepers as a weapon. Despite his brief appearances, he can be considered one of the main antagonists.

The chairman likes his position as a billionaire and wants to maintain the division between the rich and the poor as much as possible, and for this he, like all the other antagonists who serve them, requires the assistance of the Old Ones. The chairman is the main antagonist in book four, Necropolis, in which he appears more frequently than in Nightrise. In Necropolis, he turns Hong Kong into a necropolis, a city of the dead, using poisonous gases that smother Hong Kong's streets and suffocate the residents. The chairman oversees the murder of Scarlett's father, Paul Adams, when he demands he give Scarlett back to him after selling Matt to the chairman in exchange. He is next seen talking to Father Gregory about the Old Ones future goals and how they have finished with Hong Kong. He also tells Gregory that he failed by letting Scarlett go and the chairman tells him to throw himself out the window, which he does.

During the Signal 10 typhoon at the end of Necropolis, The Chairman is killed by a boat which is thrown out of the water and into his office, fulfilling the prophecy a fortune teller told him when he was young that he would be killed by a boat in Hong Kong.

=== The new Chairman ===
The second chairman of Nightrise is introduced in Oblivion. He is described as being completely bald, moving like a tortoise, and having very wrinkly and saggy skin. He is from Australia. It is said that anyone of any ethnicity can understand him; even though he speaks English and very few people in his office can. The reason for this scares his underlings.

The first we hear of the second chairman is at the Endgame Conference, where ten thousand high-ranking Nightrise members are invited to the United Nations Building in New York City, and he addresses them with a rather brief history of the Old Ones, and how close they came destroying the world ten thousand years ago, and the Five defeating them in their battle.

He also mentions that the late Nightrise agent Diego Salamander used his satellite to open the gate in the Nazca Desert, and how the Five have been reborn on the other side of time, and that the Old Ones have built Fortress Oblivion, in Antarctica. He also states that the Old Ones have double-crossed their rich associates, saying they will fight for their evil cause. This results in a riot in the UN, with twenty members of the "higher circle" dead and the rest consigned to militia training camps.

Following the double-cross, the new chairman gives Jonas Mortlake the task of bringing Scott Tyler to the dark side. He also gives him a psychological profile of Scott, made by his mother before she was killed by Warren Cornfield.

The next time the new chairman appears is at Oblivion, where he reveals to Scott the Old Ones' plan to capture Matt, following the events of Evil Star, where he wounded the King of the Old Ones. He instructs his operative Omar to follow the World Army back to their encampment and give a message to lure Matt to Skua Bay.

Matt and Richard take the bait. The Old Ones' fly-soldiers capture Richard and seal him inside a cell. They take Matt and attempt to crucify him in front of thousands of spectators, and they want Matt to watch Richard die. However, Richard turns the tables by stabbing Matt with the tumi, the ancient sacrificial knife, causing an earthquake, killing many of the spectators in the chamber. Richard then proceeds to break one of the new chairman's wrists, before the chairman is killed by a stalactite.

=== Father Gregory ===
Father Gregory is an antagonist in book four, Necropolis. His birth name is Gregor Malenkov. He is the leader of the Monastery of the Cry for Mercy in Ukraine. His monks capture Scarlett Adams when she steps through the door at St Meredith's Church. He tells her that he was born in the Soviet Union and when he was nineteen entered a seminary in England. Gregory became cynical of his teachings, as he lived a life of hardship with nothing to show for it. In the monastery Father Gregory found the door and became obsessed with it.

Father Gregory found the diary of St Joseph of Córdoba in his younger days which told him of the Old Ones. He believes the Old Ones deserve to rule the Earth "because the world is evil and so are they", and, along with seven other monks who shared his views, killed the other monks. They guard over the door, knowing that if a person steps through it, they would know they'd found one of the Gatekeepers. When Scarlett appears in the monastery, he plans to hand her over to the Old Ones, but she escapes.

Because of this failure, he kills himself in Hong Kong by walking out of a window in The Nail, the headquarters of Nightrise, on the sixty-sixth level on the orders of The Chairman.

Father Gregory is described as "the oldest man Scarlett had ever seen" and had a stye on his eyelid that dripped pus.

=== Audrey Cheng ===
Audrey Cheng is an antagonist in book four Necropolis. She is introduced when Scarlett arrives at Hong Kong airport and Scarlett takes an instant dislike to her. Although she is a woman she has the physique of a man with broad shoulders.

Cheng looks after Scarlett whilst she's in Hong Kong, although Cheng is strange, almost robotic and lifeless. Later on, Mrs. Cheng is killed by Lohan's men and revealed to be a shape changer working for the Old Ones, as her severed head changes back into that of a lizard-like creature. Scarlett says "it makes her feel sick to think that she was a shape-changer all along".

=== President Charles Baker ===
Senator Charles Baker is one of the two candidates running for the presidency of the United States. He is John Trelawny's main opponent and has been losing the election for the duration of Nightrise. At the end of the book he manages to win the election.

He knows of the Old Ones and is ready to live in a world ruled by them. Nightrise are supporting his campaign for this reason. He finally won the election due to rigged votes. His election is contested by Senator Trelawney and by many Americans who take to the streets to call for a recall.

Baker does not feature at all in Oblivion.
