= Raven's Gate =

2005 novel by Anthony Horowitz

- First earlier US edition
- Author: Anthony Horowitz
- Cover artist: London England
- Language: English
- Series: The Power of Five
- Release number: 1st in series
- Genre: Horror, Fantasy novel
- Publisher: Walker Books (UK)
- Publication date: 1 August 2005 (UK); 1 June 2005 (US)
- Media type: Print Paperback
- Pages: 270 pp
- ISBN: 1-84428-619-3 (Paperback edition)
- OCLC: 224729113
- Followed by: Evil Star

Raven's Gate is the first book in The Power of Five series, written by Anthony Horowitz. It was published and released in the United Kingdom on 1 August 2005, by Walker Books Ltd and in the United States (1 June 2005) by Scholastic Press under the adjusted series title The Gatekeepers. It is followed by Evil Star, released in 2006, Nightrise in 2007, and Necropolis in 2008, with the final book Oblivion in 2012.

== Plot ==
After being arrested for breaking and entering an Ipswich warehouse, 14-year-old delinquent Matthew 'Matt' Freeman is enrolled in a teenage rehabilitation program and sent to a farm in the village of Lesser Malling, Yorkshire. The farm is run by the stern spinster, Jayne Deverill, whose sister, Claire, is also a spinster and the local primary school's headmistress. While there, Matt experiences various unexplained phenomena, such as lights in the forest and ominous whispers, and discovers a confidential file suggesting he possesses psychic abilities. While in the woods, Matt comes across a disused nuclear power station called Omega One. A farmer called Tom Burgess tells Matt to come to his farmhouse the next day and he will help him leave. Visiting the farm the next day, Matt finds Burgess dead and the place wrecked. The words "Raven's Gate" have been painted on one wall of the bedroom. All of Matt’s attempts to inform the authorities are mysteriously thwarted, in part thanks to the villagers of Lesser Malling.

Several days later, Matt follows Jayne and Claire Deverill into the woods and watches them perform a dark magic ritual. He tries to eavesdrop, but triggers a security alarm. Jayne Deverill summons two black demon dogs, which chase him through the woods and trap him in a bog. Matt is rescued by Richard Cole, a journalist who he had previously contacted to find out about Raven's Gate. At Richard's flat in York, he hears Matt's full story.

Richard and Matt first visit a nuclear scientist called Sir Michael Marsh, who dismisses their concerns that the villagers might be trying to restart Omega One to create an excursion. They then meet with Susan Ashwood, a medium whose mother had written a book about Lesser Malling, and who Richard considers a fake.

The two finally make contact with a man called Sanjay Dravid, who works at the British Museum. Dravid informs Matt that all the villagers in Lesser Malling, including the Deverill sisters, are part of a cult which worships a group of demons known as the Old Ones, who used to rule the world before being banished by five children over ten thousand years ago. Lesser Malling was once home to a gate to the Old Ones' prison, known as Raven’s Gate, and the villagers intend to have Matt ritually sacrificed in order to bring them back and rule the world.

Dravid is killed by dark magic that brings the skeletons of dinosaurs in the museum to life. Jayne Deverill captures Richard and Matt, taking them back to Lesser Malling for the sacrifice. When Matt escapes from the farm, he is recaptured by Sir Michael Marsh, who is revealed to be the ringleader of this operation. The villagers succeed in opening a portal to the Old Ones' dimension and a huge dark creature, King of the Old Ones, appears in the gate. Just as Marsh is about to kill Matt, the latter's power awakens. Matt saves himself and Richard and the two escape. Meanwhile, a drop of Matt's blood is enough to open the gate and the Old Ones escape as the nuclear plant collapses. But the open gate creates a vacuum which pulls the radiation back inside, thus trapping the Old Ones inside and resealing the gate. In the process, the Deverills and all the other villagers die.

In the next few weeks, a society named the Nexus, to which Susan Ashwood and Dravid belonged, tells Matt and Richard that another gate exists in Peru and is in danger of opening.

== Comparison with The Devil's Doorbell ==
The Power of Five series is based on another series of books written by Anthony Horowitz between 1983 and 1989, entitled Pentagram. The Pentagram series was meant to have five books, but only four were ever published. The first was called The Devil's Doorbell, on which Raven's Gate is based.

== Awards ==
Raven's Gate won the Lancashire Children's Book of the Year award in 2006. This is Horowitz's second time winning this award after his first win in 1989 for his children's novel Groosham Grange.

== Adaptations ==
A graphic novel adaptation written for Walker Books by UK writer Tony Lee and drawn by artists Dom Reardon and Lee O'Connor was released on 3 August 2010. It was then re-issued with a new cover to coincide with then upcoming releases of the graphic novel adaptations for Evil Star and Nightrise on 6 June 2013.

In 2012, Horowitz tweeted that he had finished writing a 99 page screenplay of Raven's Gate, describing it as “a bit like Terminator but with demons”. However, Horowitz confirmed in 2021 that despite his wishes, there has been no further development as of yet on any possible film or TV adaptation of Raven’s Gate or of the Power of Five series as a whole.
