= Evil Star (disambiguation) =

Evil Star is the name of two fictional characters appearing in DC Comics.

Evil Star may also refer to:

- Evil Star (album), a 2004 power metal album by Wolf
- Evil Star (novel), the second book in The Power of Five series
- The intro track to Chunky Shrapnel by King Gizzard and the Lizard Wizard
