= Lee O'Connor (comics) =

British illustrator and comics artist

- Born: 1982 (age 43–44) Devon, England
- Areas: Penciller, Inker, Colourist
- Notable works: Vurt

Lee O'Connor is a British illustrator and comics artist. He has produced the art for Heavy Metal, Seer, Confessional and Vurt.

== Bibliography ==
=== Comics ===
- Vurt (with Jeff Noon)
- Seer (with Gary Simpson, Engine Comics, 2003)
- The Confessional (with Chris McCay, Warpton, 2004)
- 'Sky Heroes' (with Jim Massey, Commercial Suicide anthology, 2005)
- Defective Comics (with Alex de Campi, 2005)
- Contract Blues (with Mike Fugere, Ronin Studios, 2006)
- Iraq: Operation Takeover (with Sean Michael Wilson, graphic novel, War on Want/Boychild Productions, June 2007, ISBN 0-9546596-3-5)
- 'Finite' (with Andrew Dabb, in Space Doubles, Th3rd World Studios, 2008)
- 'Another Room' with Sam Costello, Split Lip, 2008)
- 'Control' (with Kieron Gillen, in Phonogram: The Singles Club #3, Image Comics, June 2009)
- 'The Ayatollah's Son: STARS' (with Pat Mills, in Ctrl.Alt.Shift Unmasks Corruption, 2009)
- The City of Abacus (with V V Brown & David Allain, 2010)
- 'The Spirit and the Flesh' (with Josef Rother, in Heavy Metal magazine, January 2010)
- Raven's Gate (adapted by Tony Lee from the book by Anthony Horowitz, 160 page graphic novel, Walker Books, 2010)
- Evil Star (adapted by Tony Lee from the book by Anthony Horowitz, 170 page graphic novel, Walker Books, 2014)
- Bartkira: Nuclear Edition (Floating World, May 2016)
- 'It's Good to be Back' comic for the Metronomy album Small World, February 2022)

=== Tabletop Games ===
- Exalted: Third Edition (Oynx Path Publishing, 2016)
- Trinity Continuum: Project Aberrant (Oynx Path Publishing, 2021)
- Trinity Continuum: Novas Worldwide (Oynx Path Publishing, 2022)
- Trinity Continuum: Adventure! (Oynx Path Publishing, 2023)

=== Magazines ===
- Delayed Gratification
- MAGAZ
