= Gloom (disambiguation) =

Gloom is a melancholy, depressing darkness, shade or despondent atmosphere.

Gloom may also refer to:

== Games and comics ==
- Gloom (card game), a 2004 card game designed by Keith Baker
- Gloom (video game), a 1995 Doom clone for the Amiga computer
- Gloom (Pokémon), a fictional species in the Pokémon franchise
- The Gloom, a comic book by Tony Lee and Dan Boutlwood
- Gloom, a fictional Xavier Institute student in the X-Men comics

== Music ==
- Gloom (album), by Macabre, 1989
- Gloom (EP), by Job for a Cowboy, 2011
- "Gloom", a song by Fireworks from Gospel, 2011
