= Auburn, California =

City in California, United States

- City
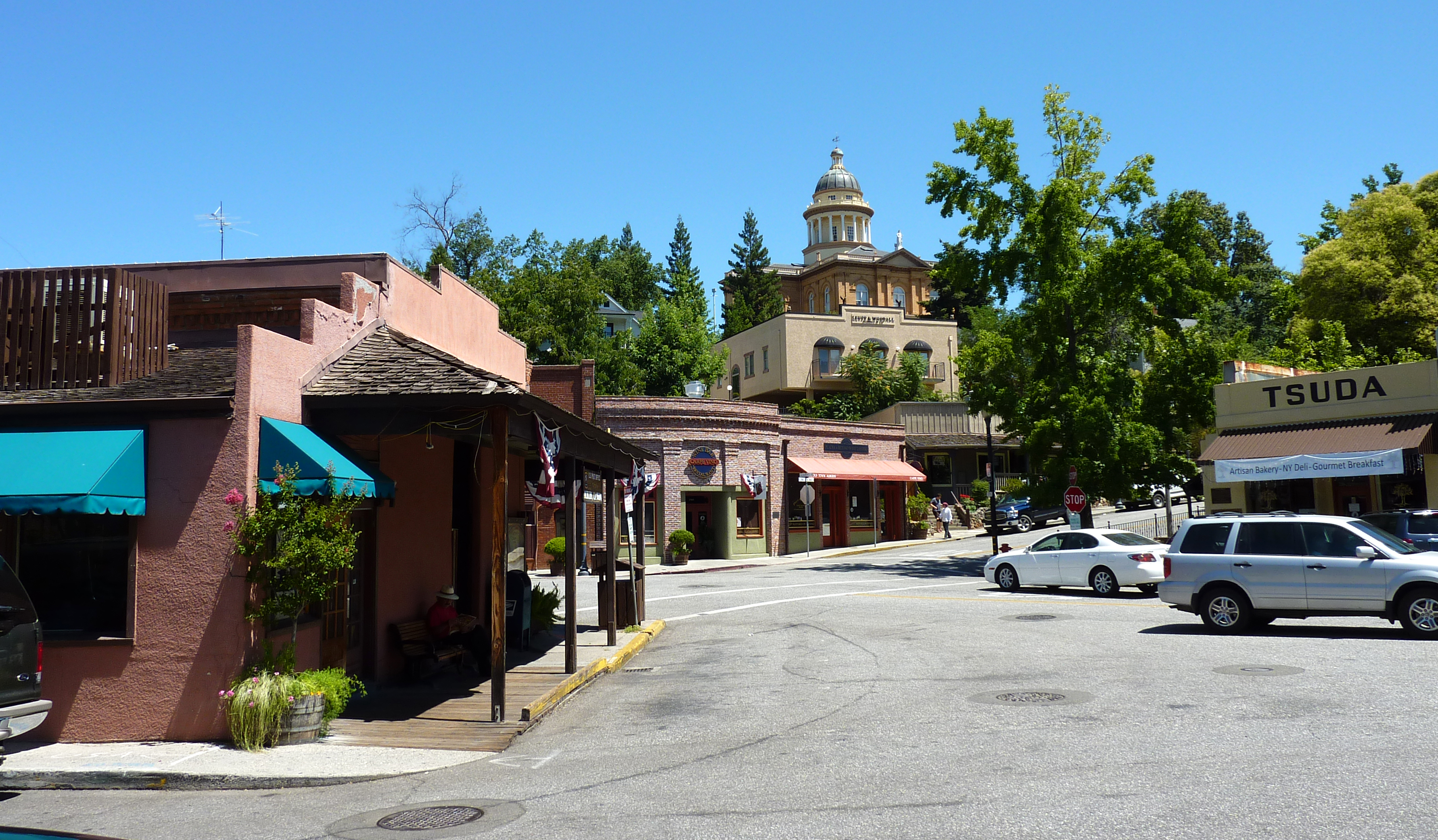
- Auburn

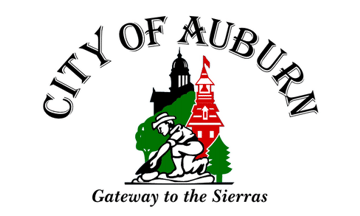
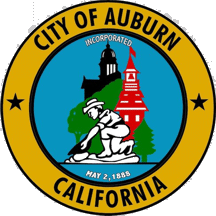
- Flag Seal
- Interactive map of Auburn, California
- Location in California Auburn (the United States) Auburn (North America)
- Coordinates: 38°53′55″N 121°4′28″W
- Country: United States
- State: California
- County: Placer
- Incorporated: May 2, 1888

Government
  - Type: Council–manager
  - Mayor: Gabriel Dressen
  - State Senate: Megan Dahle (R) and Roger Niello (R)
  - State Assembly: Joe Patterson (R)
  - House of Representatives: Kevin Kiley (I)

Area
  - City: 7.20 sq mi (18.66 km^{2})
  - Land: 7.18 sq mi (18.59 km^{2})
  - Water: 0.027 sq mi (0.07 km^{2}) 0.38%
- Elevation: 1,227 ft (374 m)

Population (2020)
  - City: 13,776
  - Density: 1,919/sq mi (741.1/km^{2})
  - Metro: est. ~19,500 (including Foresthill Applegate and Meadow Vista)
- Time zone: UTC−8 (Pacific Time Zone)
  - Summer (DST): UTC−7 (PDT)
- ZIP codes: 95602-95604
- Area codes: 530, 837
- FIPS code: 06-03204
- GNIS feature IDs: 1657964, 2409754
- Website: auburn.ca.gov

Auburn is a city in and the county seat of Placer County, California, United States. Its population was 13,776 at the 2020 census. Auburn is known for its California Gold Rush history and is registered as a California Historical Landmark.

Auburn is part of the Sacramento metropolitan area.

== History ==
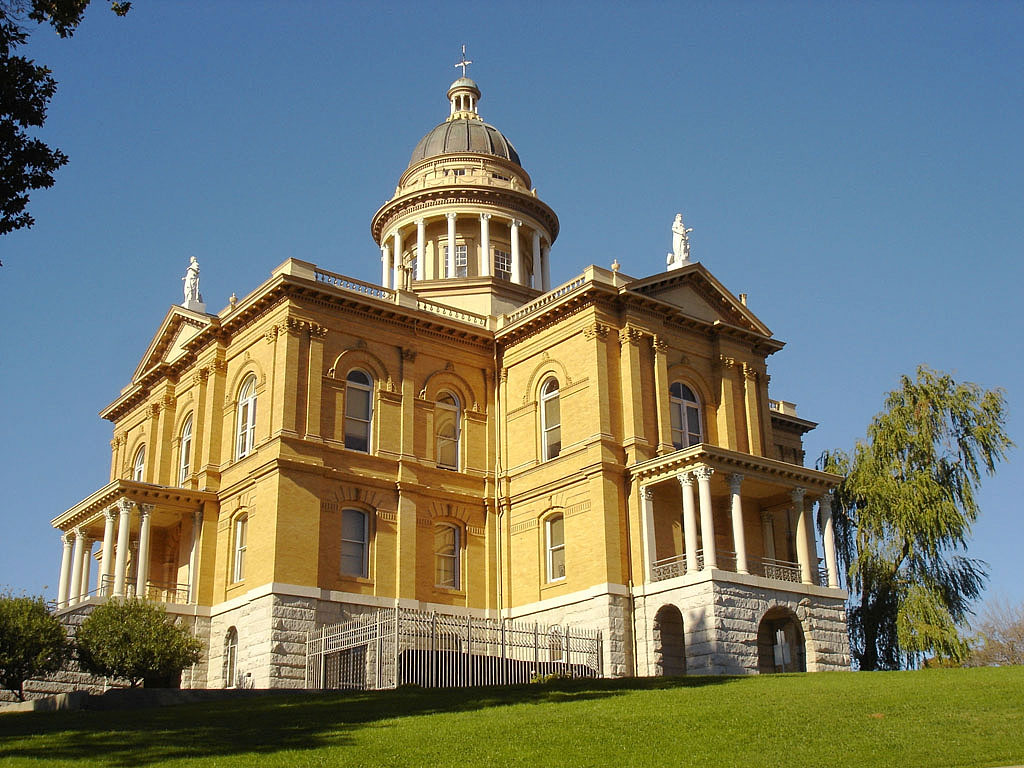
Placer County Courthouse was constructed between 1894 and 1898.

Archaeological finds place the southwestern border for the prehistoric Martis people in the Auburn area. The indigenous Nisenan, an offshoot of the Maidu, were the first to establish a permanent settlement in the Auburn area.

In the spring of 1848, a group of French gold miners arrived and camped in what would later be known as the Auburn Ravine. This group was on its way to the gold fields in Coloma, California, and it included Francois Gendron, Philibert Courteau, and Claude Chana. The young Chana discovered gold on May 16, 1848. After finding the gold deposits in the soil, the trio decided to stay for more prospecting and mining.

Placer mining in the Auburn area was very good, with the camp first becoming known as the North Fork Dry Diggings. This name was changed to the Woods Dry Diggings, after John S. Wood settled down, built a cabin, and started to mine in the ravine. The area soon developed into a mining camp, and it was officially named Auburn in August 1849, by miners from Auburn, New York. By 1850, the town's population had grown to about 1,500 people, and in 1851, Auburn was chosen as the seat of Placer County. Gold mining operations moved up the ravine to the site of present-day Auburn. In 1865, the Central Pacific Railroad, the western leg of the First transcontinental railroad, reached Auburn, as it was being built east from Sacramento toward Ogden, Utah.

The restored Old Town has houses and retail buildings from the middle of the 19th century. The oldest fire station and the Post Office date from the Gold Rush years. Casual gold-mining accessories, as well as American Indian and Chinese artifacts, can also be viewed by visitors at the Placer County Museum. Auburn was the home and birthplace of noted science fiction and fantasy poet and writer Clark Ashton Smith. A memorial to him is located near Old Town.

== Geography ==
According to the United States Census Bureau, the city has a total area of 7.2 square miles (19 km^{2}), of which 0.03 square miles (0.078 km^{2}), or 0.38%, is water.

Auburn is situated in the Northern California foothills of the Sierra Nevada range, approximately 800 vertical feet (240 m) above the confluence of the North Fork and Middle Fork of the American River. It is located between Sacramento and Reno, Nevada, along Interstate 80. Mountainous wilderness canyons and the western slope of the Sierra Nevada lie adjacent eastward, while gentle rolling foothills well-suited for agriculture lie to the west. The crest of the Sierra Nevada lies approximately 45 miles (72 km) eastward, and the Central Valley lies approximately 10 miles (16 km) to the west.

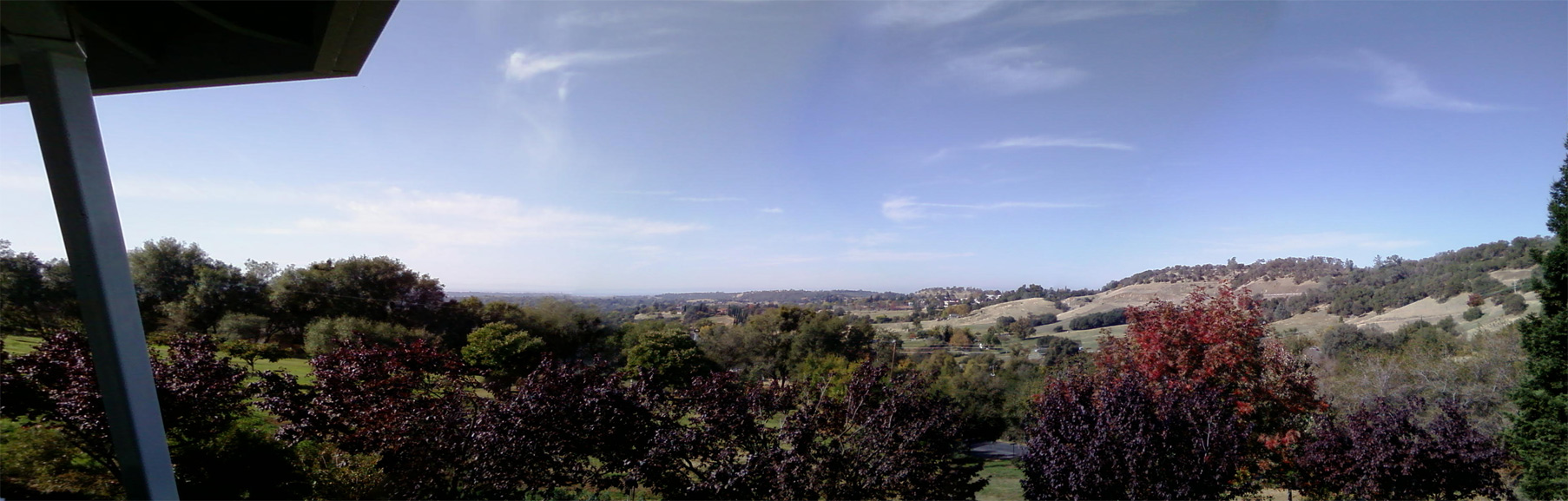
Auburn

=== Climate ===
Auburn has a hot-summer Mediterranean climate (Köppen Csa) that is characterized by cool, moist winters and hot, dry summers. Average December temperatures are a maximum of 55.8 °F (13.2 °C) and a minimum of 37.2 °F (2.9 °C). Average July temperatures are a maximum of 92.7 °F (33.7 °C) and a minimum of 63.4 °F (17.4 °C). Annually, there are an average of 62.9 days with highs of 90 °F (32 °C) or higher, an average of 7.3 days with 100 °F (38 °C) or higher, and an average of 19.6 days with 32 °F (0 °C) or lower. The record high temperature was 113 °F (45 °C) on July 15, 1972. The record low temperature was 5 °F (−15 °C) on December 9, 2013.

Average annual precipitation is 36.12 inches (917 mm). There are an average of 67 days with measurable precipitation. The wettest year was 1983 with 64.87 inches (1,648 mm) and the driest year was 1976 with 11.76 inches (299 mm). The most precipitation in one month was 23.08 inches (586 mm) in January 1909. The most precipitation in 24 hours was 5.41 inches (137 mm) on October 13, 1962, during the Columbus Day Storm. Snow rarely falls in Auburn; the most snowfall in one year was 10.7 inches (27 cm) in 1972, including 6.5 inches (17 cm) in January of that year.

Auburn's Köppen classification and climate similarities to locations such as Napa and parts of Italy make it a suitable region for growing wine grapes. Auburn and the surrounding areas of Placer County are home to over 20 wineries.

Climate data for Auburn, California, 1991–2020 normals, extremes 1905–present
Month	Jan	Feb	Mar	Apr	May	Jun	Jul	Aug	Sep	Oct	Nov	Dec	Year
Record high °F (°C)	81 (27)	78 (26)	93 (34)	92 (33)	102 (39)	110 (43)	113 (45)	111 (44)	109 (43)	104 (40)	89 (32)	80 (27)	113 (45)
Mean maximum °F (°C)	65.3 (18.5)	69.5 (20.8)	75.3 (24.1)	82.0 (27.8)	89.8 (32.1)	97.8 (36.6)	100.9 (38.3)	100.7 (38.2)	96.4 (35.8)	88.2 (31.2)	75.8 (24.3)	65.0 (18.3)	102.8 (39.3)
Mean daily maximum °F (°C)	56.3 (13.5)	59.4 (15.2)	63.1 (17.3)	68.1 (20.1)	76.9 (24.9)	85.7 (29.8)	92.7 (33.7)	92.0 (33.3)	86.8 (30.4)	76.9 (24.9)	63.8 (17.7)	55.8 (13.2)	73.1 (22.8)
Daily mean °F (°C)	47.1 (8.4)	49.7 (9.8)	52.7 (11.5)	56.4 (13.6)	64.2 (17.9)	71.6 (22.0)	78.1 (25.6)	77.4 (25.2)	73.2 (22.9)	64.3 (17.9)	53.4 (11.9)	46.5 (8.1)	61.2 (16.2)
Mean daily minimum °F (°C)	37.8 (3.2)	40.0 (4.4)	42.3 (5.7)	44.8 (7.1)	51.5 (10.8)	57.5 (14.2)	63.4 (17.4)	62.8 (17.1)	59.5 (15.3)	51.6 (10.9)	43.1 (6.2)	37.2 (2.9)	49.3 (9.6)
Mean minimum °F (°C)	28.7 (−1.8)	31.6 (−0.2)	33.9 (1.1)	35.8 (2.1)	42.1 (5.6)	47.4 (8.6)	53.8 (12.1)	53.7 (12.1)	49.0 (9.4)	41.4 (5.2)	33.9 (1.1)	27.4 (−2.6)	25.6 (−3.6)
Record low °F (°C)	17 (−8)	20 (−7)	20 (−7)	24 (−4)	25 (−4)	30 (−1)	36 (2)	41 (5)	34 (1)	26 (−3)	25 (−4)	5 (−15)	5 (−15)
Average precipitation inches (mm)	7.01 (178)	6.50 (165)	6.12 (155)	2.84 (72)	1.65 (42)	0.41 (10)	0.01 (0.25)	0.07 (1.8)	0.24 (6.1)	1.42 (36)	3.05 (77)	6.80 (173)	36.12 (917)
Average precipitation days (≥ 0.01 in)	10.7	10.3	9.2	6.6	5.0	2.0	0.2	0.4	1.4	3.2	7.0	11.0	67.0
Source: NOAA

== Demographics ==
Historical population
Census	Pop.	Note	%±
1860	814		—
1870	800		−1.7%
1880	1,229		53.6%
1890	1,595		29.8%
1900	2,050		28.5%
1910	2,376		15.9%
1920	2,289		−3.7%
1930	2,661		16.3%
1940	5,013		88.4%
1950	4,653		−7.2%
1960	5,586		20.1%
1970	6,570		17.6%
1980	7,540		14.8%
1990	10,592		40.5%
2000	12,462		17.7%
2010	13,330		7.0%
2020	13,776		3.3%
U.S. Decennial Census

=== 2020 census ===
As of the 2020 census, Auburn had a population of 13,776. The population density was 1,919.5 inhabitants per square mile (741.1/km^{2}).

The age distribution was 17.4% under the age of 18, 6.8% aged 18 to 24, 21.6% aged 25 to 44, 27.6% aged 45 to 64, and 26.6% who were 65 years of age or older. The median age was 49.0 years. For every 100 females there were 88.9 males, and for every 100 females age 18 and over there were 85.9 males age 18 and over.

The census reported that 97.8% of the population lived in households, 0.5% lived in non-institutionalized group quarters, and 1.7% were institutionalized. 99.2% of residents lived in urban areas, while 0.8% lived in rural areas.

There were 6,075 households in Auburn, of which 23.5% had children under the age of 18 living in them. Of all households, 43.9% were married-couple households, 7.1% were cohabiting-couple households, 18.2% were households with a male householder and no spouse or partner present, and 30.7% were households with a female householder and no spouse or partner present. About 32.5% of all households were made up of individuals and 17.1% had someone living alone who was 65 years of age or older. The average household size was 2.22. There were 3,650 families (60.1% of all households).

There were 6,370 housing units at an average density of 887.6 units per square mile (342.7 units/km^{2}). Of these, 95.4% were occupied and 4.6% were vacant; 59.5% were owner-occupied, and 40.5% were occupied by renters. The homeowner vacancy rate was 0.6% and the rental vacancy rate was 4.4%.

Racial composition as of the 2020 census
Race	Number	Percent
White	11,065	80.3%
Black or African American	123	0.9%
American Indian and Alaska Native	154	1.1%
Asian	317	2.3%
Native Hawaiian and Other Pacific Islander	17	0.1%
Some other race	599	4.3%
Two or more races	1,501	10.9%
Hispanic or Latino (of any race)	1,693	12.3%

== Arts and culture ==
=== Landmarks ===
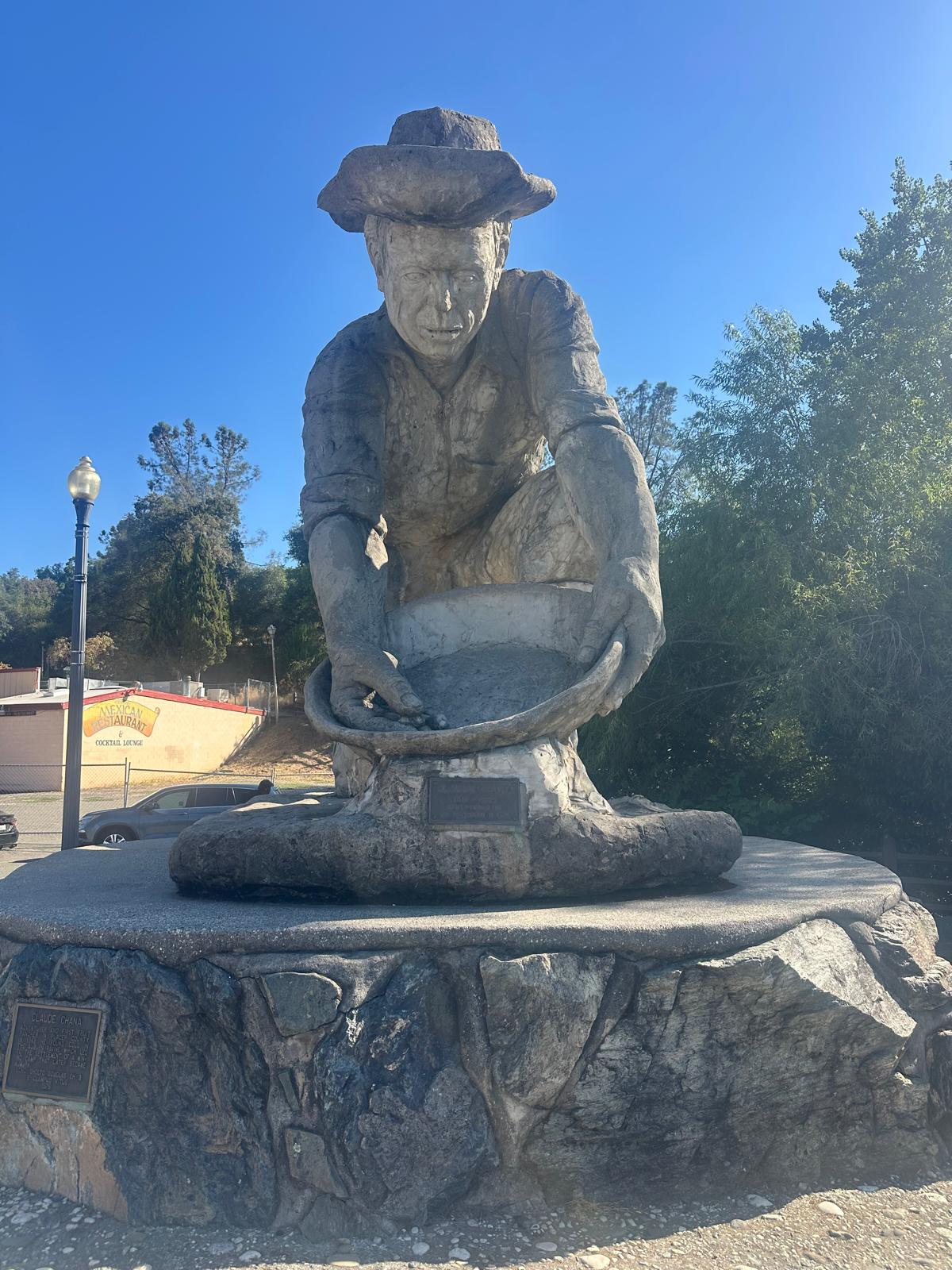
Claud Chana

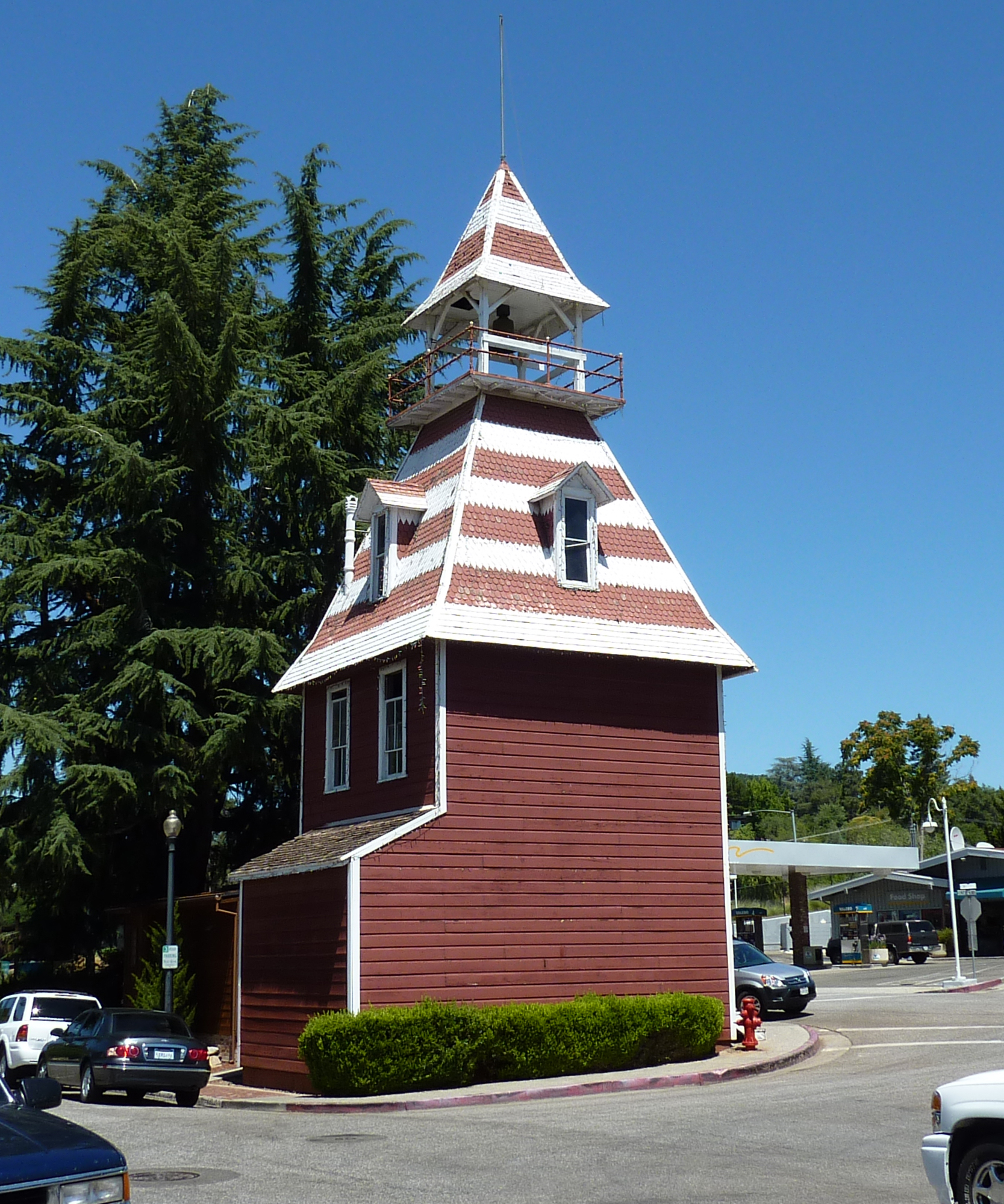
The Queen Anne-style Old Town Firehouse is a landmark. It originally adjoined a row of commercial buildings (now demolished). It was home to the Auburn Volunteer Fire Department.

Colossal sculptures are located throughout the town; the statues chronicle Auburn's history, such as a middle-aged Claude Chana gold panning in the nearby American River, and a Chinese laborer building the Transcontinental Railroad.

The Old Auburn Historic District hosts several of the city's most recognizable historic landmarks. including the Placer County Courthouse, Auburn Firehouse and its clock tower, the Joss House, public art and monumental sculptures depicting Auburn's Gold Rush.

== Education ==
Auburn is home to Placer High School, which is one of the oldest high schools in California.

== Media ==
The following films were, at least in part, shot in Auburn:

- The Adventures of Rocky and Bullwinkle
- Breakdown
- Cinema Verite
- My Family
- The Phantom
- Phenomenon
- Protocol
- The Ugly Truth
- Wisdom
- xXx

== Infrastructure ==
=== Transportation ===
Auburn is served by Amtrak passenger rail service a few times a day, and its railroad station is the eastern terminus of Amtrak California's Capitol Corridor train.

Highways include:

- Interstate 80
- California Highway 49

The Auburn Municipal Airport is located three miles (5 km) north of town, and it is solely a general aviation airport. Auburn owns and operates this airport and an industrial site. The airport site covers 285 acres (1.15 km^{2}) including an 80-acre (320,000 m^{2}) industrial site. This airport has a single 3,700 ft (1,128 m)-long runway. General aviation services are available.

== Notable people ==
- Tomas Arana (1955– ), actor
- Ben Nighthorse Campbell (1933–2025 ), Olympian in judo, United States Senator from Colorado
- Jean-Baptiste Charbonneau (1805–1866), son of Sacagawea, explorer, Orleans Hotel proprietor in Auburn, 1860–1866
- Joseph James DeAngelo (1945– ), convicted as the East Area Rapist in 2020. He was a police officer in Auburn between 1976 and 1979, the same time as when the serial rapes occurred in the Sacramento area.
- Stacy Dragila (1971- ), Olympic pole vault gold medalist
- Jeff Hamilton (1966–2023), Olympic bronze medalist, professional skier
- Jo Hamilton (1827–1904), Attorney General of California, Trustee of the California State Library, and pioneer lawyer of Placer County, California
- Meghan Hays, communications executive and special assistant to former President Joe Biden
- Clarence Hinkle (1880–1960), painter
- George Lynch (1954- ), hard rock guitarist and songwriter, worked with heavy metal band Dokken
- Kane Hodder (1955- ), stuntman and actor
- Isaiah Piñeiro (1995- ), professional basketball player
- Mary Eulalie Shannon (1824–1855), poet
- Clark Ashton Smith (1893–1961), writer and artist, one of the West Coast Romantics
- Paul Takagi (1923–2015), sociologist, criminologist, and professor at the University of California, Berkeley; he was a Japanese-American prisoner at the Manzanar War Relocation Center

== In popular culture ==
- In John Steinbeck's novel Of Mice and Men, George and Lennie were raised in Auburn.
- In Anthony Horowitz's novel Nightrise, the hometown of the Presidential candidate, Senator John Trelawny was Auburn, and it was where Jamie Tyler saved him from an assassination attempt.

== See also ==
- Auburn State Recreation Area
- Bernhard Museum Complex
- Gold Country Museum
