= Gold Country Museum =

- Location within California
- Location: Auburn, California
- Coordinates: 38.891283°N 121.075366°W
- Type: History museum
- Website: Official website

The Gold Country Museum is a history museum located in Auburn, California, United States. It focuses on the history of the California gold rush in Placer County.

== History ==
The museum building was first built as first Placer County hospital in 1855.

== Exhibitions ==
Exhibitions include a replica of a mining tunnel and an assayer's office, both of which visitors can walk through. There are also dioramas of a miner's cabin, a stamp mill, and a mining camp saloon. Exhibitions showcase gold mining techniques and the means of transportation of moving to California during the rush. Visitors can also pan for gold, play a game of faro, and watch a video about the history of the gold rush. The museum also houses a large collection of medical implements.
