= Tony Lee =

British comics writer, screenwriter, audio playwright, and novelist

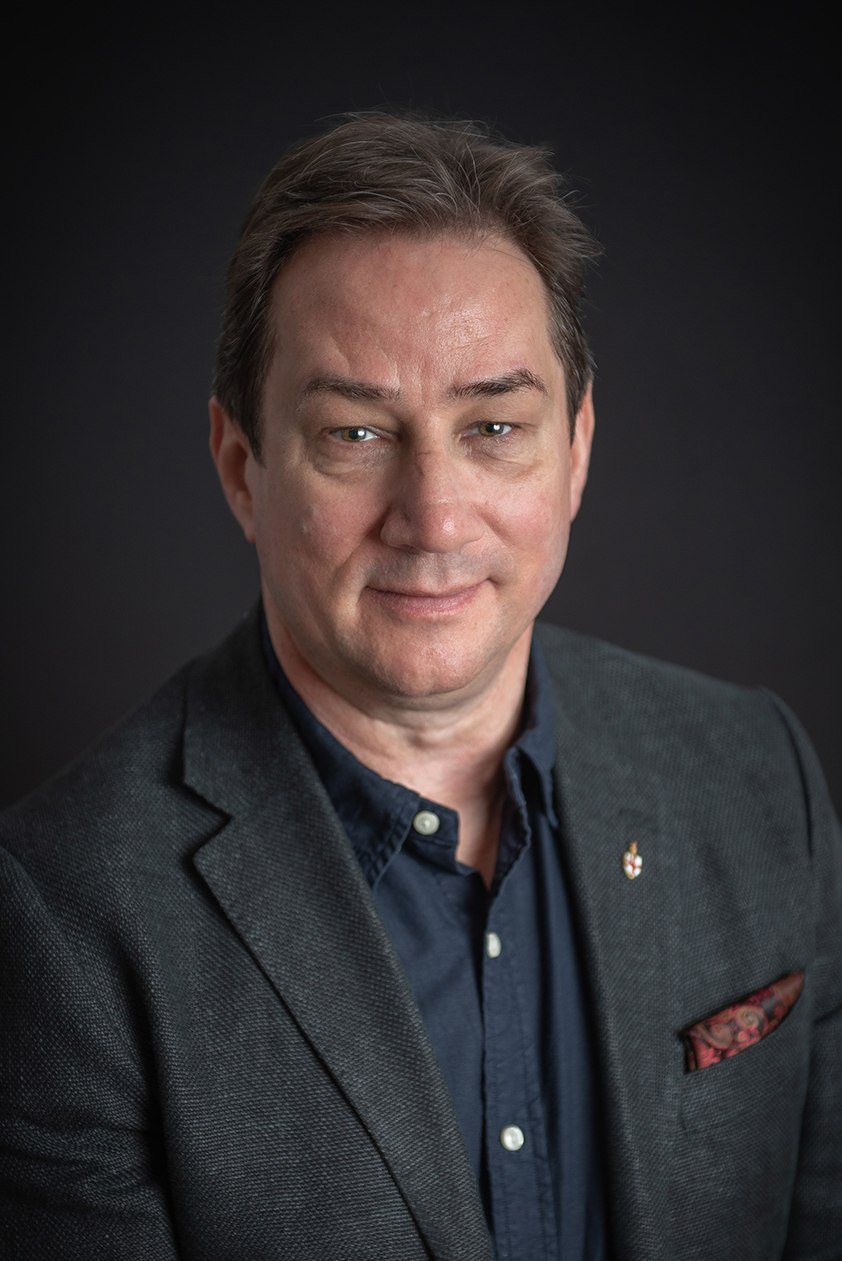
- Tony Lee in 2024.
- Born: Anthony John Lee; 1970 (age 55–56); Hayes, Middlesex, England
- Awards: NYT Best Seller; Eagle Award
- Website: https://www.tonylee.co.uk https://jackgatland.com/

Anthony John Lee (born 1970), known professionally as Tony Lee or by the pen name Jack Gatland, is a British comics writer, screenwriter, audio playwright, and novelist.

== Early life ==
Born in 1970, Tony Lee attended Hayes Manor School, now Rosedale College.

== Career ==
A #1 New York Times bestselling writer, Lee has written for various UK and US comic publishers including 2000 AD, IDW Publishing, DC Comics, Marvel Comics, Del Rey and Walker Books. He has also worked on X-Men Unlimited, Doctor Who, Superboy, Star Trek, Starship Troopers, Sherlock Holmes and Spider-Man.

In 2023 it was announced that Lee was writing a 12-part series with Iron Maiden frontman Bruce Dickinson named The Mandrake Project, connected to his 2024 solo album of the same name for Z2 Publishing. The first four came out in 2024/25 and were collected into a "Year One" book - "Year Two" is being released at San Diego Comic Con in July 2026.

In 2008 Lee became the writer of the ongoing Doctor Who comic for IDW Publishing for both Tenth Doctor and Eleventh Doctor, and was one of the writers of the 2012 Star Trek: The Next Generation / Doctor Who crossover series.

Lee has also written audio dramas for Big Finish's Doctor Who, Confessions of Dorian Gray and Bernice Summerfield ranges, as well as a Robin of Sherwood audio drama for Spiteful Puppet / ITV. His novel Dodge & Twist was adapted by Lee into a full cast audio drama starring Matt Lucas for Audible/Amazon in 2019, and his adaptation of Jules Verne's Twenty Thousand Leagues Under the Seas, and starring Adrian Lester was released in August 2020.

In April 2021, Lee announced that he had been writing crime novels under the pen name Jack Gatland and under his own Amazon-exclusive imprint, Hooded Man Media, since November 2020. Since that time, he has written over sixty novels focusing mainly on procedural, rural and cosy crime, as well as action thrillers. Under his own name, he has also been writing urban fantasies for Hooded Man Media.

As of July 2026, he has become a multi-million selling author because of this, with almost half a billion page reads on Kindle Unlimited.

== Bibliography ==
=== As Jack Gatland ===
==== DI Declan Walsh ====
#	Title	Published	
0.5	Liquidate the Profits	2020	
1	Letter from the Dead	15 November	2020
2	Murder of Angels	10 January	2021
3	Hunter Hunted	21 February	2021
4	Whisper for the Reaper	4 April	2021
5	To Hunt a Magpie	6 June	2021
6	A Ritual for the Dying	15 August	2021
7	Killing the Music	17 October	2021
8	A Dinner to Die For	12 December	2021
9	Behind the Wire	13 February	2022
10	Heavy Is the Crown	24 April	2022
11	Stalking the Ripper	17 July	2022
12	A Quiver of Sorrows	25 September	2022
13	Murder by Mistletoe	11 December	2022
14	Beneath the Bodies	26 March	2023
15	Kill Your Darlings	23 July	2023
16	Kissing a Killer	24 September	2023
17	Pretend to be Dead	24 December	2023
18	Harvest for the Reaper	24 March	2024
19	Crooked Was His Cane	30 June	2024
20	A Pocket Full of Posies	25 September	2024
21	Cheating My Destiny	15 December	2024
22	Stand and Deliver	13 April	2025
23	We Play with Death	17 August	2025
24	His Dead Man's Hand	14 December	2025
25	Digging Your Grave	26 April	2026
26	Tears of a Clown	August	2026
27	A Model for Murder	December	2026

==== Damian Lucas ====
#	Title	Published	
1	The Lionheart Curse	9 January	2022

==== Ellie Reckless ====
#	Title	Published	
1	Paint the Dead	29 May	2022
2	Steal the Gold	13 November	2022
3	Hunt the Prey	19 June	2023
4	Find the Lady	26 November	2023
5	Burn the Debt	11 August	2024
6	Take the King	7 September	2025
7	Save the Fool	30 June	2026
8	Bury the Past	08 February	2027

==== Tom Marlowe ====
#	Title	Published	
1	Sleeping Soldiers	29 August	2022
2	Target Locked	30 January	2023
3	Covert Action	22 May	2023
4	Counter Attack	23 October	2023
5	Stealth Strike	26 February	2024
6	Broad Sword	27 May	2024
7	Rogue Signal	28 October	2024
8	Sniper Alley	24 February	2025
9	Shadow Threat	23 June	2025
10	Sentry Point	20 October	2025
11	Burning Ledgers	23 March	2026
12	Judas Goats	31 December	2026

==== Standalone ====
#	Title	Published	
1	The Boardroom	13 February	2023

==== Liam Harper ====
#	Title	Published	
1	Final Claim	24 March	2025
2	Blood Ridge	14 July	2025
3	Track Shift	24 November	2025
4	Cross Roads	8 June	2026

==== Sebastian Silver (Carlyle & Silver Cozy Mysteries) ====
#	Title	Published	
1	Silver and the Sunday Cypher	29 September	2025
2	Silver and the Christmas Caper	22 December	2025
3	Silver and the Moonlit Murder	21 March	2026
4	Silver and the Wedding Veils	13 July	2026

==== DCI Chloe Hunter (Hunter & Chase) ====
#	Title	Published	
1	Salt Marsh Bones	31 May	2026

==== Moriarty & Co Mysteries ====
#	Title	Published	
1	The Moriarty Murders	27 October	2026

=== Comics ===
==== DC Comics / Zuda ====
- Where Evils Dare (with Stefano Martino, October 2009)
- Superboy #18 (Dialogue, 2013)

==== Del Rey / Random House ====
- Pride and Prejudice and Zombies: (adapted from the book by Seth Grahame-Smith and Jane Austen, 160 page graphic novel, art by Cliff Richards, May 2010)

==== Dynamite Entertainment ====
- The Hollows (with Amanda Hocking), (adaptation), March 2013
- Battlestar Galactica: Starbuck #1 - 4 (miniseries), November 2013
- Steampunk Battlestar Galactica: 1880 #1 - 4 (miniseries), August 2014

Hachette Children's Books

- The Phone Goes Dead (adapted from the book by Anthony Horowitz, 44 page graphic novella, art by Dan Boultwood (August/September 2010)
- Scared (adapted from the book by Anthony Horowitz, 44 page graphic novella, art by Dan Boultwood. August/September 2010)
- The Hitch-Hiker (adapted from the book by Anthony Horowitz, 44 page graphic novella, art by Dan Boultwood, August/September 2010)
- Killer Camera (adapted from the book by Anthony Horowitz, 44 page graphic novella, art by Dan Boultwood, August/September 2010)
- Sherlock Holmes: The Baker Street Irregulars - The Adventure Of The Missing Detective (44 page graphic novella, art by Dan Boultwood, May 2011)
- Sherlock Holmes: The Baker Street Irregulars - The Adventure Of The Phantom Of Drury Lane (44 page graphic novella, art by Dan Boultwood, May 2011)
- Sherlock Holmes: The Baker Street Irregulars - The Adventure Of The Charge Of The Old Brigade (44 page graphic novella, art by Dan Boultwood, June 2011)
- Sherlock Holmes: The Baker Street Irregulars - The Adventure Of The Family Reunion (44 page graphic novella, art by Dan Boultwood, June 2011)
- Bandits: Grandpa's Goalscarers (32 page graphic novella, art by Ben Scruton, February 2018)
- Bandits: Space Corps (32 page graphic novella, art by Ryan Pentney, February 2018)
- Bandits: The Timely Adventures of Captain Clock (32 page graphic novella, art by Pol Cunyat, May 2018)
- Bandits: Mister Clip-Clop, Intergalactic Space Unicorn (32 page graphic novella, art by Neil Slorance, May 2018)
- Bandits: Teacher Creatures (32 page graphic novella, art by Marc Ellerby, June 2018)
- Bandits: The Great Pet Shop Rescue (32 page graphic novella, art by Giovanni Costa, June 2018)
- Bandits: Agent of P.A.W.S (32 page graphic novella, art by Wil Overton, November 2018)
- Bandits: My Little Brother's A Zombie (32 page graphic novella, art by Pedro J. Colombo, November 2018)

==== Heavy Metal Publishing ====
- Heavy Metal #287: "S.A.T.O" (with Ozzy Osbourne, July 2017)
- Megadeth: Death By Design (with Gyula Nemeth, June 2019)
- Heavy Metal special: Soft Wood: "Who, M.D" (with Dan Boultwood, June 2019)

==== IDW Publishing ====
- Doctor Who: The Forgotten (with art by Pia Guerra/Stefano Martino/Kelly Yates, 6-issue limited series, August 2008 - January 2009)
- Doctor Who: "The Time Machination" - a 22-page one shot - art by Paul Grist, May 2009
- Doctor Who V1 #1-16 (art by various, ongoing series, July 2009)
- Doctor Who V2 #1-12 (art by various, ongoing series, January 2011)
- Star Trek: The Next Generation / Doctor Who: "Assimilation²" #1-4 (art by J.K Woodward, May 2012)
- Doctor Who V3 #13-16 (art by Mike Collins, ongoing series, September 2013

==== Image Comics ====
- MacGyver - Fugitive Gauntlet #1 - 5 (miniseries), co-written with Lee David Zlotoff, art by Will Sliney (2013)

==== Kickstart Entertainment ====
- Danger Academy: 88 page graphic novel (with Dan Boultwood & Ciaran Lucas)

==== Legendary Publishing ====
- Monarch: The Lost Adventures: graphic novel (art by Tony Shasteen)

==== Markosia Publishing ====
- Starship Troopers:
  - "Blaze of Glory" (with Sam Hart, previously published through Mongoose Publishing)
  - "Dead Man's Hand" (with Neil Edwards)
  - "Damaged Justice" (with Shanth Enjeti/Sam Hart)
  - "Marooned"(with Chris Dibari, Starship Troopers issues #1-4, April 2007 - July 2007)
- The Gloom (with Dan Boultwood, 5-issue mini-series)
- Midnight Kiss (with Ryan Stegman/Kieran Oats, 5-issue mini-series)
- Shadowmancer (with G.P. Taylor/Pedro Delgado/Ian Sharman, 10-part adaptation)
- Brothers - The Fall of Lucifer (with Wendy Alec/Sam Hart - cancelled)
- The Doppleganger Chronicles (with G.P. Taylor and Dan Boultwood, graphic novel/prose hybrid)
- The Tizzle Sisters and Erik (with G.P. Taylor, graphic novel/prose hybrid, October 2006)
- Hope Falls (with Dan Boultwood, 5-issue mini-series, November 2007 - March 2008, collected as Hope Falls: The Ultimate Edition)
- From The Pages Of Bram Stoker's 'Dracula': Harker (with Neil Van Antwerpen/Peter-David Douglas, graphic novel)
- Also Known As: (132 page graphic novel, art by Christopher Jones)
- Dark Lines of London (with Stephen Saleh/Mariela Malova, graphic novel)

==== Marvel Comics ====
- X-Men Unlimited #1: "Memories" (with Ben & Ray Lai)
- Amazing Fantasy #18: "Mark Hazzard - MERC" (with Leonard Kirk/Kris Justice)
- Spider-Man Family #9: "Identity" (with Ramon Bachs/Kieran Oats)
- Amazing Spider-Man Family #5: "Treasure, Hunted" (with Mark Robinson)
- Marvel Heroes #31: "Blind Date / Rooftop Gauntlet"

==== Moonstone ====
- Lady Action (with Jake Minor)
- Captain Action Winter Special (various, 2011)

==== MTV Comics ====
- The Gloom: Ongoing, weekly from February 2011 (with Dan Boultwood)
- Agent Mom: Ongoing, weekly from March 2011 (with Alaina Huffman, John Huffman IV, Dan Boultwood and Ciaran Lucas)

==== Panini Comics ====
- Doctor Who: "FAQ" (with Mike Collins, in Doctor Who Magazine #369-371, 2006)

==== Pegasus Publishing ====
- Echoes of Sherlock Holmes: 'Mrs Hudson Investigates' (art by Bevis Musson, 2016)

==== Rebellion ====
- Stalag #666 (with art by Jon Davis-Hunt, in 2000 AD #1600-1614, August–November, 2008)
- Citi Def: "Field Trip" (with art by Jack Lawrence, in Judge Dredd Megazine #279-283, January–April 2009)
- Necrophim (with art by Lee Carter):
  - "Hell's Prodigal" (in 2000 AD #1655-1665, September–December 2009)
  - "Civil Warlord" (in 2000 AD Prog 2011 #1715-1723, December 2010 - March 2011)
- Tales From the Black Museum:
  - "The Incredible Teatime Torture Show" (with Vince Locke, in Judge Dredd Megazine #284, May 2009)
  - "Who do the Voodoo that you do?" (with Jon Davis-Hunt, in Judge Dredd Megazine #285, June 2009)

==== The DFC / Random House ====
- The Prince Of Baghdad (14 part story, art by Dan Boultwood, starting August 2008)
- St Spooky's School For Girls (8 part story, art by Rob Guillory, comic cancelled before release)

==== Titan Comics ====
- Wallace and Gromit:
  - "Trouser pressed" (in #25)
  - "Where Beagles Dare" / "A Close Snip" (in #26)
- Doctor Who: The Tenth Doctor Archives Vol. 1 (various, 2016)
- Doctor Who: The Tenth Doctor Archives Vol. 2 (various, 2016)
- Doctor Who: The Tenth Doctor Archives Vol. 3 (various, 2016)
- Doctor Who: The Eleventh Doctor Archives Vol. 1 (various, 2016)
- Doctor Who: The Eleventh Doctor Archives Vol. 2 (various, 2016)
- Doctor Who: The Eleventh Doctor Archives Vol. 3 (various, 2016)

==== Walker Books ====
- Outlaw: The Legend Of Robin Hood: (with Sam Hart, 140 page graphic novel, Summer 2009)
- Raven's Gate: (adapted from the book by Anthony Horowitz, 160 page graphic novel, art by Dom Reardon, 2010)
- Excalibur: The Legend Of King Arthur: (with Sam Hart, 140 page graphic novel, Spring 2011)
- Evil Star: (adapted from the book by Anthony Horowitz, 160 page graphic novel, art by Lee O'Connor, 2013)
- Messenger: The Legend Of Joan of Arc: (with Sam Hart, graphic novel, February 2014)
- Nightrise: (adapted from the book by Anthony Horowitz, 160 page graphic novel, art by Nigel Dobbyn, 2014)
- Pirate Queen: The Legend Of Grace O'Malley: (with Sam Hart, graphic novel, 2019)

==== Z2 Publishing ====
- The Mandrake Project (with Bruce Dickinson), ongoing from 2024
- Iron Maiden: Piece Of Mind: (graphic novel, 2024)
- Pantera: Vulgar Display of Power: (graphic novel, 2025)
- Beartooth: The Journey Below: (graphic novel, art by Szymon Kudranski, 2021)

==== Other ====
- Trailer Park of Terror #4: "What You Wish For" (with Paul Ridgon, Imperium Comics, 2003)
- Digital Webbing Presents #18: "Jigsaw Lady" (with Owen Gieni, Digital Webbing, 2004)

=== Additional Novels ===
==== Haven Book Group / Badger Learning ====
- Teen Reads: Jigsaw Lady
- Teen Reads: Stalker
- Teen Reads: Mister Scratch
- Teen Reads: Noticed
- WOW Facts: Vampires
- WOW Facts: Sherlock Holmes
- Dark Reads: Otis (illustrations by Kev Hopgood)
- Dark Reads: Doctor Jekyll and Little Miss Hyde

==== Ransom Publishing ====
- GamerHate

==== Chinbeard Books ====
- Robin Of Sherwood: The Trial Of John Little

==== Amazon Publishing ====
- Dodge And Twist

=== Audios ===
==== Audible ====
- Dodge & Twist
- Twenty Thousand Leagues Under The Sea

==== Big Finish ====
- Doctor Who: Rat Trap
- Bernice Summerfield: Private Enemy No. 1
- Bernice Summerfield: Vesuvius Falling
- The Confessions of Dorian Gray: Ghosts of Christmas Past

==== Spiteful Puppet / ITV ====
- Robin of Sherwood: The Trial of John Little

=== Film and TV ===
==== BBC Television ====
- Doctors: "To Walk In Her Shoes"

== Awards ==
- 2006: Midnight Kiss nominated in the "Favourite Small Press Colour Comicbook (British)" Eagle Award
- 2007: Starship Troopers nominated in the "Favourite Color Comic Book (British)" Eagle Award
- 2008:
  - Starship Troopers & Hope Falls nominated in the "Favourite Color Comic Book (British)" Eagle Award
  - Hope Falls nominated in the "Favourite New Comic Book" Eagle Award
  - Tony Lee nominated in the "Favourite Newcomer Writer" Eagle Award
- 2009:
  - Tony Lee nominated in the "Favorite Writer" Eagle Award
  - Doctor Who nominated in the "Favourite American Comic Book: Colour" Eagle Award
  - Doctor Who nominated in the "Favourite New Comic Book" Eagle Award
  - Doctor Who: The Forgotten nominated in the "Favourite Continued Story Published During 2009" Eagle Award
  - Doctor Who: The Forgotten nominated in the "Favourite Reprint Collection" Eagle Award
  - Doctor Who: The Time Machination nominated in the "Favourite Single Story Published During 2009" Eagle Award
  - From The Pages Of Bram Stoker's 'Dracula': Harker nominated in the "Favourite Single Story Published During 2009" Eagle Award
  - Outlaw: The Legend Of Robin Hood nominated as a Junior Library Guild Fall Selection
  - Outlaw: The Legend Of Robin Hood nominated as an American Library Association 2010 Great Graphic Novels for Teens nomination
- 2010:
  - Doctor Who nominated in the "Favorite American Comic Book: Colour" Eagle Award
  - Doctor Who: Fugitive nominated in the "Favorite Reprint" Eagle Award
- 2011:
  - Excalibur: The Legend Of King Arthur nominated as an American Library Association 2012 Great Graphic Novels for Teens nomination
- 2012:
  - Doctor Who #12 winner of the "Favorite Single Issue" Eagle Award
