= Paul Takagi =

Japanese-American sociologist (1923–2015)

- Born: May 3, 1923; California, U.S.
- Died: September 13, 2015 (aged 92); Oakland, California, U.S.
- Scientific career
- Fields: Sociology; Criminology
- Institutions: University of California, Berkeley

Paul Takao Takagi (May 3, 1923 – September 13, 2015) was a Japanese-American sociologist, criminologist, social justice activist, and professor at the University of California, Berkeley. He had been a prisoner at the Manzanar War Relocation Center located near Independence, California, beginning in 1942, as part of the enforcement of Executive Order 9066.

== About ==
He was born on May 3, 1923, in Auburn, California, with the name Takao Takagi. His father, Tomokichi Takagi, was from Hiroshima. According to Takao Takagi's sister Hannah, Tomokichi Takagi immigrated to the United States in 1902. Hannah recalled that their mother, Yasu Takagi, arrived in the United States several years after their father. The Takagis owned a fifty-acre strawberry farm.

Takagi was a sociologist, criminologist, and professor at the University of California, Berkeley. He taught at the university's School of Criminology until it was shut down by Governor Ronald Reagan in 1974. Unlike all of the other faculty members at the School, however, he remained at Berkeley after the school's closure, since he had already been granted tenure.

Takagi and his wife provided a residence for Wendy Yoshimura released on bail to them in 1975. He was a noted advocate for social justice and community policing, and was a key figure in the Third World Liberation Front strikes of 1968 on Berkeley's campus. A leading scholar of radical criminology, he was also active in researching racial disparities in police use of force in the United States. In 2008, he received a Lifetime Achievement Award from the Association for Asian American Studies.
