= The Power of Five =

Series of five fantasy suspense novels by Anthony Horowitz

- UK logo for The Power of Five (as the series is known there)
- Raven's Gate (2005); Evil Star (2006); Nightrise (2007); Necropolis (2008); Oblivion (2012)
- Author: Anthony Horowitz
- Country: United Kingdom
- Genre: Fantasy, horror, thriller
- Publisher: Walker Books (UK); Scholastic Corporation (US)
- Published: 2005–2012
- Media type: Print (hardcover and paperback), audiobook, e-book
- No. of books: 5

The Power of Five (known as The Gatekeepers in the US) is a series of five fantasy and suspense novels, written by English author Anthony Horowitz. Published between 2005 and 2012, it is an updated re-imagining of Horowitz's Pentagram series, which the author had left unfinished in the 1980s after he only wrote four of the five planned books in the series.

The novels deal heavily in the occult and examples of things such as human sacrifice and blood rituals are major plot elements, such as in the first book, where Matthew Freeman is hunted by a cult who want to conduct a blood sacrifice on him to blast open a portal using a combination of nuclear physics and black magic, to unlock another dimension which is holding a group of ancient evil demons captive.

The series is published in the United Kingdom by Walker Books Ltd and in the United States by Scholastic Press.

== Plot overview ==
The series focuses on five children: Matthew Freeman, Pedro, Scott Tyler, Jamie Tyler, and Scarlett Adams, a group of five modern day teenagers with some sort of power who are expected to defeat the Old Ones and save humanity.

== Adaptations ==
Walker Books has so far released graphic novel adaptations for the first three novels in the series, with all three being written by Tony Lee. Raven’s Gate was released on 3 August 2010, with Evil Star and Nightrise released on 2 January 2014 and 6 November 2014 respectively.

In 2012, Horowitz tweeted that he had finished writing a 99-page screenplay of Raven's Gate, describing it as “a bit like Terminator but with demons”. In 2014, there were rumours that Warner Bros. have acquired the film rights to the book series, but Horowitz confirmed on Twitter a few years later that this wasn’t so. As of 2021, despite Horowitz’s wishes and recent success with the Alex Rider series adaptation, there has been no further development as of yet on any possible film or TV adaptation of the Power of Five series.
