= Neil Slorance =

Scottish comics artist (born 1987)

- Born: 17 February 1987 (age 39); Glasgow, Scotland, U.K,
- Occupations: Comic artist, political cartoonist, illustrator
- Writing career
- Language: English
- Genres: Science fiction, fantasy, politics
- Notable work: Dungeon Fun

Neil Slorance (born 17 February 1987) is a Scottish comics artist, known as the artist of Dungeon Fun, as well as for his political cartoons. He has contributed strips to Titan Comics' Doctor Who comics alongside Dungeon Fun writer Colin Bell.

== Comics ==
Slorance created the sitcom webcomic Jonbot vs Martha with Colin Bell in 2011. Slorance and Bell collaborated again on the critically acclaimed Dungeon Fun between 2013 and 2015.

Slorance provided illustrations for a short story, How To Be a Ghost: An Illustrated Guide, with writer Campbell Miller in 2011. Another collaboration, How To Be Suave, was released in 2013.

In 2012, Slorance began writing a series of travelogues, starting with Nine Lines of Metro. A second travelogue, Seven Days in Berlin, was released later in 2012. A third travelogue, Let's Go to Bordeaux was released in 2014.

Slorance published The Amateur Astronomer's Journal in 2013, a short story about "a home computer worker taking the night off to go look at the stars".

In 2014, Slorance and Bell began contributing strips to Titan Comics' Doctor Who: The Twelfth Doctor series.

In 2016, Slorance released a collection of autobiographical comics entitled Modern Slorance: Torts and Tinder.

== Political cartoonist ==
Slorance first began drawing political cartoons during the 2014 Scottish independence referendum. His political cartoons subsequently attracted media attention during the 2015 general election after receiving recognition from Scottish First Minister Nicola Sturgeon, following which he live sketched STV's election night coverage. He was then hired by STV to draw the Neil Slorance Sketch, a regular feature. In 2017, he left STV and later moved to The National newspaper to draw "The Slorance Sketch".

On 22 January 2016, one of his cartoons signed by Sturgeon was auctioned at the Govan Kingston SNP's Burns supper event to support her re-election.

== Personal life ==
Slorance lives in Glasgow with his pet tortoise, Herman. In 2015, a video of him awakening his tortoise went viral, accumulating more than a million views and being featured on the American television show Right This Minute. Neil Slorance is the younger brother of the digital marketing expert Mark Slorance.

== Awards and nominations ==
In 2012, Jonbot vs Martha was nominated for four Scottish Independent Comic Book Alliance (SICBA) awards.

In 2013, Amateur Astronomer's Journal was nominated for three SICBA awards.

In 2014, Slorance won the Best Cover and Best Artist awards at the SICBA, and Dungeon Fun Book One received the award for Best Comic or Graphic Novel.

In 2015, Slorance was ranked 99th in The List's Hot 100.

In 2016, Slorance was ranked 90th in The List's Hot 100, climbing nine places from the previous year.
