= Nightrise =

2007 novel by Anthony Horowitz

- Author: Anthony Horowitz
- Language: English
- Series: The Power of Five
- Release number: 3rd in series
- Genre: Fantasy novel, adventure novel, thriller novel
- Publisher: Walker Books (UK)
- Publication date: 2 April 2007 (UK)
- Publication place: United Kingdom
- Media type: Print (Paperback)
- Pages: 365 pp
- ISBN: 1-84428-621-5 (Paperback edition)
- OCLC: 77013026
- Preceded by: Evil Star
- Followed by: Necropolis

Nightrise is the third book in The Power of Five series, written by Anthony Horowitz. It was published and released in the UK on 2 April 2007 by Walker Books Ltd. It is preceded by Evil Star, released in 2006, and followed by Necropolis, which was released on 30 October 2008. The title is a reference to both the fictional organisation represented in the book, and the Old Ones' eclipsing presence on Earth.

== Plot summary ==
The story begins with fourteen-year-old identical twin brothers Jamie and Scott Tyler, performing in a theatre in Reno, Nevada. The Nightrise Corporation is to kidnap the boys, who are part of the magic show that has performed at the theatre for the past six months. Their foster father, Don White, sells the twins to them for $150,000, but Jamie escapes and is pursued. Scott is captured but Jamie is rescued by a woman. He awakens at a motel in which the woman is renting a room. The woman, who introduces herself as Alicia, says that her son, Daniel, was kidnapped by the same corporation after exhibiting clairvoyant powers. She takes Jamie to his foster parents' house only to realise they have been murdered by Nightrise, and that he and Scott have been framed for it; they escape only when Jamie uses his telepathic powers.

Alicia and Jamie go to Los Angeles where he reveals his backstory. He then tells her of his previous foster parents, with the alcoholic father committing suicide after threatening to separate the twins, and the weird and inexplicable "accidents" associated with them. He tells her about a strange, tattoo-like mark he has on his arm and that he thinks he is an American Indian. After these incidents, he and Scott refused to read or control anyone's minds, except for each other's. They find a lead to one of the men that kidnapped Scott, Colton Banes, and Alicia persuades Jamie to read his mind to find out where Scott is. Jamie manages to find out where Scott is being held: Silent Creek, a juvenile prison, where he is being tortured in an attempt to force him to side with Nightrise.

Alicia decides to seek help from her boss, John Trelawny, who is running for the presidency, and manages to convince him about Jamie's powers, and to help him get into Silent Creek. Trelawny affirms Jamie's powers and agrees to help him. Jamie is given a false identity and criminal history, those of juvenile crystal meth dealer Jeremy Rabb, and is imprisoned at Silent Creek, out in the desert. He finds that his brother is in solitary confinement there and that Alicia's son Daniel is there too, also in solitary confinement. One night, when he tries to use his power to demand that the power-hungry and abusive chief guard Max Koring take him to his brother, he realises that his powers do not work in the prison, because of some magnetic field that neutralises special powers. Koring puts him in solitary confinement for his rudeness, and secretly calls Banes to tell him he has found a Gatekeeper.

Jamie suffers a nightmarish vision during solitary confinement, triggered by the second gate opening, though he is unaware of what has happened. In Peru, Richard and Professor Chambers find Pedro by the helicopter. Pedro tells them that Matt went by himself to stop the gate from opening. Thinking Matt is dead, Richard runs until he finds Matt. Matt "looks like all the life was sucked out of him" and is in a coma. After seeing he has a pulse, Richard runs back to bring get help for Matt.

Joe Feather, the Native American intake officer at Silent Creek, knows of the mysterious tattoo on Jamie's shoulder, having seen all of the boys during the embarrassing strip search upon their arrival. He explains to Jamie that the twins are two of the Five, but Scott has already left Silent Creek. They work out a convincing plan to save Daniel and escape, whilst at the same time, Colton Banes is on their way to Silent Creek to kill Jamie. A fight goes on between Feather's tribe and Banes' men, resulting in Jamie being shot in the shoulder and Banes killed by an arrow.

Feather manages to break out with Daniel and Jamie, but Jamie falls unconscious following his shooting, and a female shaman is called on to bring him back. During this, however, Jamie is transported back in time to the height of the war between humanity and the Old Ones ten thousand years ago in what would later become England. It becomes clear that the original Gatekeepers are exactly the same as the Gatekeepers in the present, just with different names (except for Matt, who says "I prefer to use my name from your world"). Matt is obviously the leader, and most knowledgeable of the Gatekeepers. He tells Jamie that he sent fellow Gatekeeper Sapling to his death on purpose, as Chaos, the King of the Old Ones would then think he had won; however, if a Gatekeeper dies, his counterpart from the future/past would take his place, hence why Jamie is there. Jamie then participates in the battle against the Old Ones, in which the Old Ones are defeated and banished, having mistakenly thought that only four of the Five could come together and letting their guard down. At the place where the Five congregate, a gate is built on the battlefield, to be called Raven's Gate by future generations, whilst another gate is built in what will later become Peru. Jamie sees an eagle, which Matt explains is there to take him back to his own time.

Jamie wakes up in the present and, with Feather and Daniel, travels back to Reno to reunite Daniel with Alicia, parting ways with Feather afterwards. When he is asleep that night, he is spoken to again by a grey man in the dream world of the Gatekeepers (as he had been during the novel), who keeps saying "they're going to kill him". He finally realised what it means, originally mistaking that Scott was telling him that he was the one going to be killed, but he realises that Scott is the person going to kill John Trelawny. Throughout the book, Nightrise have been wanting Trelawny's rival, Charles Baker, to become president, as he will support the return of the Old Ones. However, when Trelawny became too popular, despite bad press created by Nightrise, assassination becomes the only option, as suggested by Nightrise's west American executive Susan Mortlake. It becomes apparent that this will take place during his birthday parade in his hometown of Auburn.

Alicia, Danny and Jamie hurry to Auburn to stop the assassination. Jamie sees Scott with Susan Mortlake, in the crowd, and he tries to send a telepathic message to him, but it fails. Desperate, Jamie commands Warren Cornfield, Trelawny's chief bodyguard and would-be assassin (being controlled by Scott), to aim the gun at Susan Mortlake. Cornfield shoots and kills Mortlake, and in the chaos, Jamie takes Scott and meets up with Alicia and Danny. They meet Natalie Johnson, a member of the Nexus and a friend of Trelawny's, who gives them her car to escape. Policemen immediately come after them and the twins bid farewell to Alicia and Danny. Jamie and Scott use a hidden doorway in a cave at Lake Tahoe and emerge in Cuzco at the Santo Domingo Church. The twins find their way to the Nazca desert and meet with Matt and Pedro, the first and second Gatekeepers.

Meanwhile, Scarlett Adams takes an aeroplane to Hong Kong to meet her father, who works for Nightrise. As Scarlett is about to leave, she finds out that John Trelawny has lost the election and that it is suspected that Nightrise had rigged the ballots as a failsafe.

== Comparison with The Silver Citadel ==
The Power of Five series is based on ideas from a series written by Anthony Horowitz between 1983 and 1989, entitled Pentagram. The Pentagram series was meant to have five books but only four were ever published, of which the third was The Silver Citadel. In contrast to the original novel, Nightrise has some significant alterations that either change, expand or modernise the plot. Some of these changes made in Nightrise include the notable omission of the Queen of the Old Ones, a significantly more detailed section set in the past, and the introduction of Scar (The Power of Five series equivalent of the Pentagram series' character Will Tyler) a book earlier than originally depicted.

== Adaptations ==
A graphic novel adaptation written for Walker Books by UK writer Tony Lee and drawn by artist Nigel Dobbyn was released on 6 November 2014.
