= Necropolis (Horowitz novel) =

2008 novel by Anthony Horowitz

- Author: Anthony Horowitz
- Language: English
- Series: The Power of Five
- Release number: 4th in series
- Genre: Fantasy novel, thriller novel
- Publisher: Walker Books (UK)
- Publication date: 30 October 2008 (UK) 15 April 2009 (USA)
- Publication place: United Kingdom
- Media type: Print (Hardback)
- Pages: 388 pp
- Preceded by: Nightrise
- Followed by: Oblivion

Necropolis is a fantasy novel by British writer Anthony Horowitz. It is the fourth novel in his The Power of Five series. The book was released in the United Kingdom and Australia on 30 October 2008, and it had sold 190,000 copies worldwide before Christmas 2008.

== Plot ==
On a school field trip to St Meredith's Church, Scarlett Adams finds herself magically transported to a monastery in Ukraine, where she is captured by monks who worship the Old Ones. Scarlett escapes and returns to St Meredith's.

The media storm resulting from Scarlett's disappearance alerts Matthew Freeman in Peru that Scarlett is the new Gatekeeper. Matt, Jamie Tyler and Richard Cole travel to London, but narrowly miss meeting Scarlett. The Nexus informs them that Scarlett's father works for the Nightrise Corporation and has taken her to Hong Kong, a city that is suspected of housing the Old Ones. Matt, along with Jamie and Richard, travel to Macau in search of Scarlett, on the advice of the Nexus.

Scarlett arrives in Hong Kong and is looked after by a Mrs. Cheng, who turns out to be a shape shifter from the Old Ones. Scarlett is rescued by a member of the Chinese Triads, Lohan Shan Tung. Lohan attempts to help Scarlett escape Hong Kong, but her father betrays her to Nightrise. Scarlett discovers her power is weather control when the shock of her father’s betrayal causes her to create a powerful typhoon, which approaches Hong Kong.

Matt, Jamie and Richard meet with Lohan's father Han Shan-tung, who agrees to help them infiltrate Hong Kong. Matt allows himself to be captured by the Old Ones and is taken to Scarlett.

Jamie, Richard, and Lohan rescue them and take them to the Tai Shan Temple, where they manage to get through the typhoon with Scarlett's help.

The Chairman of the Old Ones reveals the Old Ones' plan to turn Hong Kong into a necropolis, or city of the dead. The Chairman is killed by a stray wooden sampan caught in the typhoon. Pedro and Scott arrive in Hong Kong through a magical door.

When Scarlett is shot in the head, she loses control over the typhoon, which explodes with all its might. The Five Gatekeepers, Lohan and Richard manage to get through the door before it is destroyed. The novel ends on a cliffhanger as Chaos, the King of the Old Ones, prepares to commence the war to conquer the planet and wipe out humanity.

== Comparison with Day of the Dragon ==
Necropolis is a re-write of the 1989 novel Day of the Dragon, which is part of Horowitz’s unfinished Pentagram series. A noteworthy difference from the original novel is the gender-swapping of the lead character Will Tyler to a female counterpart called Scarlett Adams, who is also Horowitz's first female literary hero. According to Horowitz, this change resulted a complete rewrite of the original.

== Reviews ==
The Guardian gave a mixed review, saying, "There is not much action in the book," but called the storyline "one to marvel over." Booklist and Kirkus Reviews likewise praised the book for its tense, action-driven plot.
