= Delayed Gratification (magazine) =

UK magazine

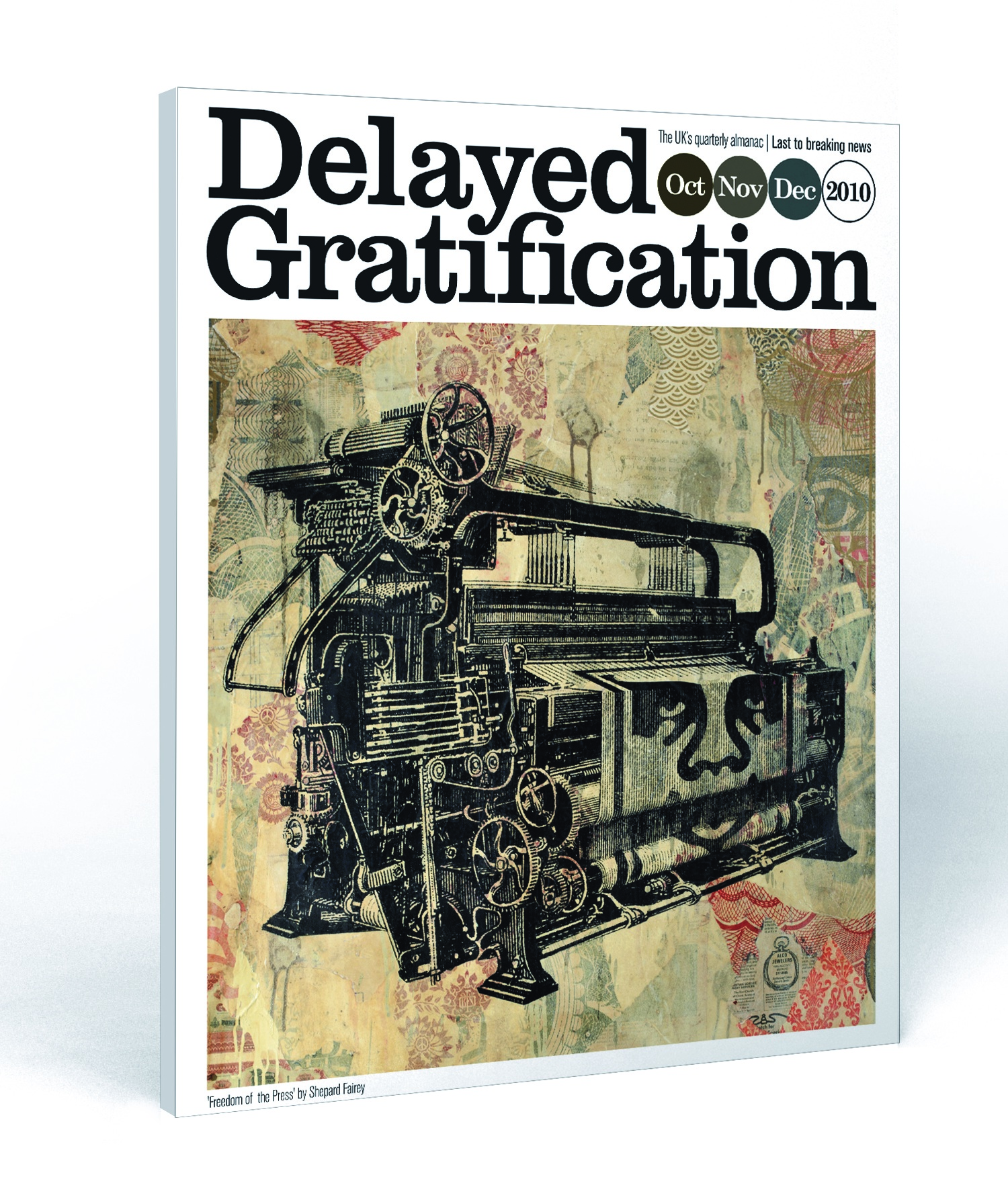
- Issue one of Delayed Gratification
- Editor: Marcus Webb and Rob Orchard
- Staff writers: James Montague, Matthew Lee, Christian Tate (Art Director)
- Categories: News/Culture/Art/Politics/Sport/Current Affairs
- Frequency: Quarterly
- First issue: 10 January 2011
- Company: Slow Journalism Company
- Country: UK
- Based in: London
- Language: English
- Website: www.slow-journalism.com

Delayed Gratification is a quarterly magazine published in the United Kingdom by The Slow Journalism Company. It is edited by Marcus Webb and Rob Orchard. It covers the news events of the previous three months, and its slogan is "last to breaking news". The magazine is an example of the slow movement and is described as "an antidote to throwaway media".

The magazine features daily summaries for the quarter covered, plus long-form articles, photo features and infographics on the biggest stories of the period. Each issue features cover art by a different artist. The first issue was published in January 2011 and featured the article "Freedom Of The Press" by Shepard Fairey.
