= The Gloom =

Comic Book

The Gloom is a comic book by writer Tony Lee and artist Dan Boutlwood, originally released through the publisher APC. It was created as a 5-issue mini-series, but despite some critical attention the title was canceled before it was finished due to the publisher going out of business.

In 2020 it was announced that MTV would be serializing a new, redrawn version of the book on their MTV Geek site, starting from 1 February 2011.
