= Oblivion (Horowitz novel) =

Fifth and final novel in The Power of Five series by Anthony Horowitz

- First edition
- Author: Anthony Horowitz
- Language: English
- Series: The Power of Five
- Release number: 5th in series
- Genre: Fantasy novel, thriller novel
- Publisher: Walker Books (UK)
- Publication date: October 2012 (UK)
- Publication place: United Kingdom
- Media type: Print (Hardback)
- Pages: 700 pp
- Preceded by: Necropolis

Oblivion is a fantasy novel by British writer Anthony Horowitz. It is the fifth and final book in The Power of Five series. The book is set in England, New York City, Giza, Dubai, Brazil, Italy and Antarctica. Horowitz began writing Oblivion in 2009 and finished it in 2012, when it was then released in the United Kingdom on 4 October 2012. Horowitz has stated that he had researched global warming for this novel.

Oblivion marks a significant change in the narrative, being the only novel in the series set in the future - The novel is narrated in third-person in some places, switching between the points of view of Matt, Pedro, Scott, Jamie and Scarlett, while in others places, it is narrated in first-person by brand new character called Holly.

== Plot synopsis ==
After being separated from the world for ten years, the Gatekeepers and their closest allies finally come back through the mysterious doors. Jamie is the first to appear, in a church called St Botolph's, somewhere in the northeast of England, located in a strange and seemingly hostile village. There is no electricity nor power of any kind and the townspeople are wary and hostile. He meets a girl named Holly, and a strange man who calls himself "the Traveller", who takes them under his wing. In the village, Jamie is having trouble fitting in. He tells Holly the truth about him and the Five. She initially doesn't believe him but soon sees the truth when one of her villagers, teacher Anne Keyland, betrays them to the police. The police, under the control and protection of the Old Ones, kill everyone in the village and then obliterate the village itself. The Traveller saves Jamie, and Holly comes along, despite the Traveller disagreeing with this idea.

Meanwhile, the executives of the now nigh-all-powerful Nightrise Corporation are in the ruins of New York attending a business conference named the "Endgame" where it is said, they will be given their rewards. But these "rewards" are really to become leading soldiers of the Old Ones. A riot ensues in the United Nations and twenty of the executives are killed. All but one of the rest are consigned to training camps to prepare for the outcome. The one who survived is Jonas Mortlake, who is given, by the new chairman, the task of winning Scott over to the Old Ones, to allow them to capture Matt.

Scarlett and Richard have arrived in Egypt, and are rescued by Albert Remy, an agent of the Nexus, and they are taken to Tarik, a freedom fighter who is fighting against the Old Ones' chief servant in Egypt, Field Marshal Karim El-Akkad. Richard discovers that the children who were supposedly injured by El-Akkad's forces and are being treated in a Nexus-run hospital are child soldiers, used by Tarik to fight the ruling military. Sickened, Richard also discovers that the vehicle being used to escort him and Scarlett out of Egypt is equipped with explosives, in a plan to kill them and El-Akkad in the same attempt. He changes the license plates and other details of the bomb jeep with another, and he, Scarlett, and Remy leave the fort, meeting a driver who is really El-Akkad. Tarik detonates the bomb, unaware of Richard's actions. Richard and Scarlett kill El-Akkad, but Remy is mortally wounded and dies soon after, on the road to Dubai.

Scott and Pedro come through a door in Italy, where they are immediately captured by the police working for the Old Ones and imprisoned in a castle. Scott is taken to meet Jonas Mortlake, who was at the Endgame Conference, but he was the chief executive officer of Nightrise (as well as the son of Susan Mortlake) so he wasn't recruited for the militia. He assigns Scott the task of betraying the others if he breaks Pedro's finger to prove his loyalty. Scott, drugged and weary, does so. But later when he meets Pedro he is shocked by his action. He telepathically forces Jonas to break his own finger and they leave. But Mount Vesuvius erupts and all but destroys Naples. Pedro only gets on a ship through a servant named Giovanni who saves him, but Pedro has to swim through human sewage to get out of the castle where he and Scott were imprisoned.

Meanwhile, Matt and Lohan have arrived in Brazil, and Matt is encouraging Lohan to sell him for money, and then steal him back. He sells him to a drug lord and rescues him. Matt visits the dreamworld in the library where the Librarian gets the book of Matt's life out for him to read all the way through. Matt does and is shocked at his future which reveals him being betrayed, then tortured and killed. But he knows it is destiny so he goes along with it, knowing that it will work. First, he needs to get to Antarctica, to the frozen wasteland of Oblivion, and to do this, he needs to find one of the doors.

Scarlett and Richard bury Remy and take his wallet, before arriving at Dubai Airport and meeting First Officer Zack Martins, formerly of Emirates, now a buyer for the childish and insane Sheikh Rasheed al Tamin. His captain, Larry Carter, stole some of Rasheed's treasure and is set to be executed. Richard creates a plan to break Larry out of prison, by going to Rasheed's favourite haunt: a casino. There, Scarlett bets the contents of Remy's wallet on roulette and wins, but Rasheed disqualifies her and invites her and Richard to his palace for dinner. During the meal, Rasheed plans to force Scarlett to marry him, threatening to kill Richard if she refuses. But Rasheed's wife helps them escape, with Larry, and they race back to the airport, taking off and heading to Antarctica.

Matt and Lohan both get wound up in mining gold whilst carrying out their plan again. However, unable to find a door in the gold mine, they break out and, though Matt falls ill, manage to steal a jet. Despite Lohan wanting to go to the United States and then return to Asia, Matt controls the plane and steers it towards Oblivion in Antarctica.

Jamie, Holly, and the Traveller make a dark and dangerous journey towards London - which no longer exists, as Jamie knows it, because it was bombed by terrorists shortly after the Gatekeepers disappeared, as well as eight other cities in Britain, which were all hit on the same day. But the door in Saint Meredith's church still exists, and this is what Jamie is looking for. But on the way to London, they run into a village whose inhabitants have become cannibals, as well as being pursued by Commander Eleanor Strake, the Old Ones' chief servant in England. However, they do manage to get to the Nexus, and it is revealed that the Traveller was actually Graham Fletcher, from the Nexus.

En route to Rome, Pedro's ship is hit by a tsunami from the volcanic eruption but it survives. Then they get to the Vatican where Pedro meets a family called the Riveras, the son of whom, Silvio, is a cardinal who is in the Pope's circle, as well as part of the Pontifical Commission. Pedro sees the daughter, Maria, is sick with terminal pancreatic cancer and cures her with his powers. Silvio is disillusioned and dismayed at Pedro's power and tries to kill Pedro because "there can only be one Saviour" and it is not him, but Pedro saves himself by vomiting out the poison the priest used. Silvio dies, having poisoned himself for being unable to kill someone and live, but Pedro survives.

The twenty-five doors are locked with a supernatural power that kills whoever tries to work them. Scott works this out and manages to work a way around it. But first, the chairman of Nightrise wants him to betray Matt. He puts it as a choice between wealth or suffering. Meanwhile, the World Army, led by Commander Cain, that has arrived in Antarctica, decides to launch an attack on the Old Ones, despite Matt advising otherwise. This ends in more than half the Army being massacred, and the rest are only saved when Matt creates a chasm in the ice. Scott then summons Matt to Skua Bay, where the betrayal is carried out. Before the Old Ones come and take Matt and Richard away, Matt tells Scott that it was never his role to save the world, but it was actually Scott's.

Jamie receives the signal that Matt had promised in the dreamworld, saying that the doors are about to open. He and Holly manage to get to the door in St. Meredith's after surviving an attack by the giant spider. Pedro escapes and meets a good-hearted janitor called Leo Tasso who takes him to a door in the Vatican, which Pedro wants to use to get to Oblivion, the Old Ones' palace, in Antarctica.

The Old Ones crucify Matt and lacerate him and then summon Richard to say goodbye, before killing him in front of Matt. Richard now understands why he was given the magical Incan 'tumi' knife and kills Matt with it to end his pain. This not only sets the sky on fire but it causes a great earthquake that kills the chairman and many of the Old Ones' servants watching Matt's torture. Meanwhile, Scott is being beaten by Jonas, seeking revenge for earlier, as well as revealing that the Old Ones never wanted him, but Lohan kills Jonas. Scott opens the doors, but the electrical power inside the lock proves fatal to him. The doors open and Jamie, Holly, and Pedro arrive in Oblivion. Scott manages to say goodbye to Jamie before dying in his arms.

The Old Ones converge on Scarlett, Pedro, and Jamie, thinking this is their victory, and Chaos himself, the King of the Old Ones, appears. But the version of Matt from the past and Flint, Scott's past form, arrive to fight Chaos. All the Five are together at last and they plunge their swords into Chaos, killing him. The ground splits open and a chasm into space is revealed into which a third gate forms and all the Old Ones are banished into it, as well as some nuclear missiles which the human resistance has unleashed. With evil gone, apparently for good, the Five leave for the dream world, their victory complete. They find the dreamworld is now full of colour and life. Richard, Holly, and Lohan return to the resistance which is victorious and they set back home to England. Lohan goes off to the East looking for the Triads. Holly, Richard, and the Traveller go to a new village and settle there. The world begins repairing itself and things start to get better.

== Relation to the Pentagram series ==
Unlike the previous entries in the Power of Five series, this book is unique in that it isn't a rewrite of one of Horowitz's previous Pentagram novels. Despite that, Horowitz revealed in 2012 that he'd planned the ending thirty years prior to the writing and publication of Oblivion, which was when he was originally writing the Pentagram series.
