= Evil Star (novel) =

2006 novel by Anthony Horowitz

- Author: Anthony Horowitz
- Language: English
- Series: The Power of Five
- Release number: 2nd in series
- Genre: Fantasy novel, adventure novel, thriller novel, Horror fiction
- Publisher: Walker Books (UK)
- Publication date: 1 April 2006 (UK); 1 June 2006 (US)
- Publication place: United Kingdom
- Media type: Print Paperback
- Pages: 272 pp
- ISBN: 1-84428-620-7 (Paperback edition)
- OCLC: 62761363
- Preceded by: Raven's Gate
- Followed by: Nightrise

Evil Star is the second book in The Power of Five series by British author Anthony Horowitz. It was published and released in the United Kingdom on 1 April 2006 by Walker Books Ltd and in the United States by Scholastic Press under the adjusted series title, The Gatekeepers. It is preceded by Raven's Gate, released in 2005, and followed by Nightrise, released in 2007.

== Plot summary ==
Following the events of Raven's Gate (which took place a few weeks before the beginning of Evil Star), Matt goes to a new private school which the Nexus are funding, but is left friendless because of a bully named Gavin Taylor, causing Matt to injure Taylor by using his powers. Susan Ashwood and Fabian, members of the Nexus, ask him to help them acquire an old diary which could enable them to stop a second gate that keeps the Old Ones out of our world from being opened. Matt, feeling his life is spinning out of his control, refuses.

Meanwhile, Gwenda Davis, Matt's aunt, has fallen under the influence of dark forces. She kills her partner Brian, steals a petrol tanker, and drives it into Matt's new school in a desperate kamikaze attempt to kill him. Fortunately, he uses his clairvoyance powers and manages to evacuate the whole school before it happens. Matt realises that he must stop the Gate from being opened and agrees to meet the bookseller, William Morton, at St Meredith's Church after a meeting with the Nexus. Morton affirms him to be one of the Five, but he is killed in the process and the diary is stolen on the behalf of Diego Salamanda, a Peruvian media baron and bidder who wants to use the diary to open the second gate. The Nexus persuade Matt and his father figure, Richard Cole, to fly to Peru, find the second gate, and stay at a house belonging to Fabian. However, on their way to the newly planned rendezvous, the Hotel Europa, the car is ambushed and Richard is kidnapped; luckily Matt manages to escape.

With the help of a local Peruvian Pedro, Matt manages to get to the meeting place but is captured by the Peruvian police at the hotel, led by the sadistic Captain Rodriguez, and brutally beaten. Pedro saves him using his slingshot after which the two of them escape to 'Poison Town', where Pedro lives. Strangely, while all the town is affected by disease, the street where Pedro lives seems unaffected. Here, they meet Pedro's unofficial guardian, Sebastian (who can speak English, unlike Pedro), who agrees to help Matt. Matt then finds that all the wounds from his beating have, remarkably, healed themselves very quickly. As night passes, Matt meets Pedro in a dream, revealing that he is one of the Five.

Thinking Salamanda had Richard kidnapped, Matt and Pedro travel to his hacienda in Ica, but they are discovered. Salamanda reveals that he does not have Richard. An Inca, Micos, one of Richard's kidnappers, helps them escape, but he is killed in the process. He tells them to travel to Cuzco before he dies; at Cuzco, Matt manages to contact Fabian and the Nexus on their whereabouts. However, Rodriguez and the police arrive, but Matt and Pedro escape with the help of several Incas, led by Micos' brother, Atoc. The boys are taken to the Mountain of the Sleeping God, Mandingo. From there, they descend into the town of the last Incas, Vilcabamba, where Richard, having been staying there after being separated, is waiting for them.

Reunited with Matt, Richard reveals that the kidnapping was conducted to prevent Matt from reaching the Hotel Europa. Based on the Salamanda's knowledge of their movements, Matt and Richard deduce that there is a traitor in the Nexus tipping him off. At the village, it is learned that the gate is located somewhere in the Nazca Desert. Matt, Richard and Pedro travel to the Nazca Desert with Professor Joanna Chambers, an expert on everything Peruvian, and Matt realises that the Nazca lines are the second gate. The gate will only open once all the stars align with each of the drawings; however, the gate has been constructed such that the stars will never all align at once, and in this case, the star Cygnus is not in its proper position. However, Salamanda has sent a satellite as a substitute star, an evil star, to open the gate.

Matt and Pedro break into Salamanda's media headquarters with the aid of the Incas in an attempt to stop his plan, by destroying the radio mast controlling the satellite. At the control centre, it is revealed that Fabian is the traitor in the Nexus, having believed it was pointless to try and stop the opening of the gate. Rodriguez then bursts into the room and shoots Fabian when he tries to stop Matt and Richard from being killed. The radio mast is destroyed and falls into the building, flattening Rodriguez. In his dying moments, Fabian reveals that Salamanda had taken control of the satellite once it was in range, using a different satellite dish out in the desert.

Atoc takes Matt and Pedro on a helicopter to the dish, but the helicopter crashes, killing Atoc and breaking Pedro's ankle. Matt has no choice but to stop the gate from being opened alone. He manages to trigger his power, destroying the dish and trailer Salamanda is using, and kills Salamanda when he shoots at Matt by deflecting two bullets back to him. However, Matt realises that the satellite will still be continuing on its trajectory, opening the Gate. The Nazca lines crack open and an army of demons arise, before the King of the Old Ones climbs out. Matt uses the full extent of his powers against the demons but the King of the Old Ones punches Matt into a coma. The Old Ones, biding their time, temporarily hide from the universe.

Matt is taken to Professor Chambers' house and a doctor examines him but does not think he will survive. But Pedro comes back from the hospital early and insists on being alone with Matt. At this point, Pedro's power is revealed to be the power to heal. This explains the reason why the street Pedro lived in was the only place in Poison Town that was unaffected by disease and how the injuries Matt received at the hands of Captain Rodriguez had healed after only a few hours. Matt awakes from his coma thanks to Pedro and decides that the only way they can defeat the Old Ones is to find the other three Gatekeepers.

== Comparison with The Night of the Scorpion ==
The Power of Five series is based on ideas from a series written by Anthony Horowitz between 1983 and 1989, entitled Pentagram. The Pentagram series was meant to have five books, but only four were ever published. The second was The Night of the Scorpion, on which Evil Star was based.

== Adaptations ==
A graphic novel adaptation written for Walker Books by UK writer Tony Lee and drawn by artist Lee O'Connor was released on 2 January 2014.
