= The Maltese Falcon (novel) =

1930 novel by Dashiell Hammett

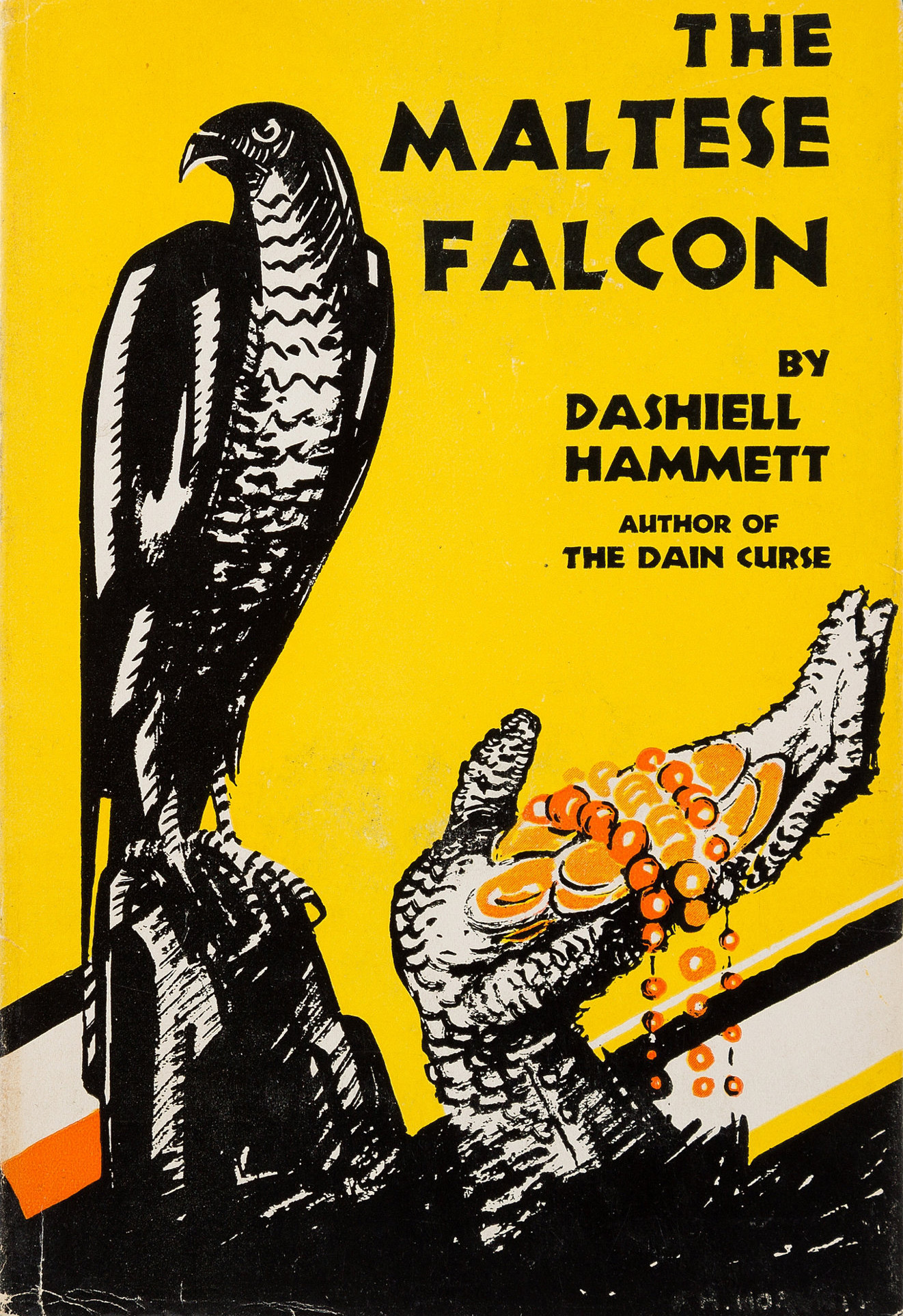
- Cover of the first edition
- Author: Dashiell Hammett
- Language: English
- Genre: Detective fiction; Hardboiled
- Published: 1929 (Black Mask); 1930 (Alfred A. Knopf)
- Publication place: United States
- Media type: Print (hardcover)
- Dewey Decimal: 813.52
- LC Class: PS3515 .A4347 .M3
- Preceded by: The Dain Curse
- Followed by: The Glass Key
- Text: The Maltese Falcon online

The Maltese Falcon is a 1930 detective novel by American writer Dashiell Hammett, originally serialized in the magazine Black Mask beginning with the September 1929 issue.

The story follows private detective Sam Spade in San Francisco, California, who becomes entangled in a web of lies, betrayal, and murder while pursuing a group of criminals desperate to obtain a priceless, jewel-encrusted falcon statuette. The story is told entirely in external third-person narrative; there is no description whatsoever of any character's thoughts or feelings, only what they say and do, and how they look.

The novel has been adapted several times for the cinema. It is considered part of the hardboiled genre, which Hammett played a major part in popularizing.

== Plot ==
Sam Spade is a private detective in San Francisco, in partnership with Miles Archer. The beautiful "Miss Wonderly" hires them to follow Floyd Thursby, who she claims has run off with her sister. Archer takes the first stint but is found shot dead that night. Thursby is also killed later and Spade is a suspect. The next morning, Spade coolly tells his office secretary, Effie Perine, to have the office door repainted to read simply "Samuel Spade".

"Miss Wonderly" is soon revealed to be an acquisitive adventuress named Brigid O'Shaughnessy, who is involved in the search for a black statuette of unknown but substantial value. Others are after this falcon, including Joel Cairo, an effeminate criminal, and Casper Gutman, a fat man accompanied by a vicious young gunman, Wilmer Cook. O'Shaughnessy begs for Spade's protection while telling him as little as possible. They meet with Cairo at Spade's apartment, and Spade again presses O'Shaughnessy for details; again she stalls but kisses Spade. The next morning, she is asleep in his bed. Leaving her there, Spade slips out to search her apartment.

Effie believes O'Shaughnessy "is all right" and Spade should help her. Effie agrees to hide her at her own home, but O'Shaughnessy disappears again. When Spade meets Gutman in his hotel room, neither will tell what he knows. Spade implies he is looking out for himself, not O'Shaughnessy. Red herrings abound. The police suspect Spade in the shootings: he was sleeping with Archer's wife, Iva. The District Attorney ties the shootings to Dixie Monahan, a Chicago gambler who had employed Thursby as a bodyguard in the Far East.

At a second meeting, Gutman tells Spade the history of the tribute of the Maltese Falcon. It was made of gold and jewels by the 16th-century Knights of Malta as a gift to the King of Spain but was captured by pirates. After passing from owner to owner, at some time it was coated with black enamel to conceal its value. Gutman traced the falcon to General Kemidov, a Russian exile in Constantinople and hired O'Shaughnessy to get it; she brought in Cairo to help. O'Shaughnessy and Thursby fled with the falcon to Hong Kong and from there to San Francisco. During this conversation, Gutman drugs Spade, who passes out on the floor.

Spade awakens alone and returns to his office where a wounded ship's captain staggers in with a package containing the falcon and dies. O'Shaughnessy calls the office, begs for Spade's help, but sends him on a wild goose chase. When he returns, O'Shaughnessy is waiting in front of Spade's apartment building. Inside Spade's apartment they find Gutman, Wilmer, and Cairo in wait with guns drawn. Gutman presents $10,000 in cash for the falcon, but Spade argues that the police must arrest someone for the murders. During a fight, Spade knocks Wilmer out, and Gutman agrees to give Wilmer to the police.

Spade has Effie fetch the falcon, but Gutman discovers it is a fake (a decoy made by General Kemidov, or possibly the falcon of legend was never real). During the excitement, Wilmer escapes. Gutman decides to go to Constantinople for the real falcon; Cairo joins him and they leave. Spade then calls the police and tells them the story, adding that he has Wilmer's guns and other evidence. While they are waiting, he bullies O'Shaughnessy into confessing her real role.

Archer was shot with Thursby's gun, but by her. She has lied to him and double-crossed him. O'Shaughnessy admits all this, but pleads that she is in love with Spade. Maybe he does care for her, Spade admits, but tells her, "I won't play the sap for you" – for personal reasons as well as needing justice for his dead partner; if she can get off with a long prison term, he'll wait for her, but if she hangs, he'll always remember her. When the police arrive, he turns her in, and the police tell him Wilmer has just shot Gutman dead.

== Background ==
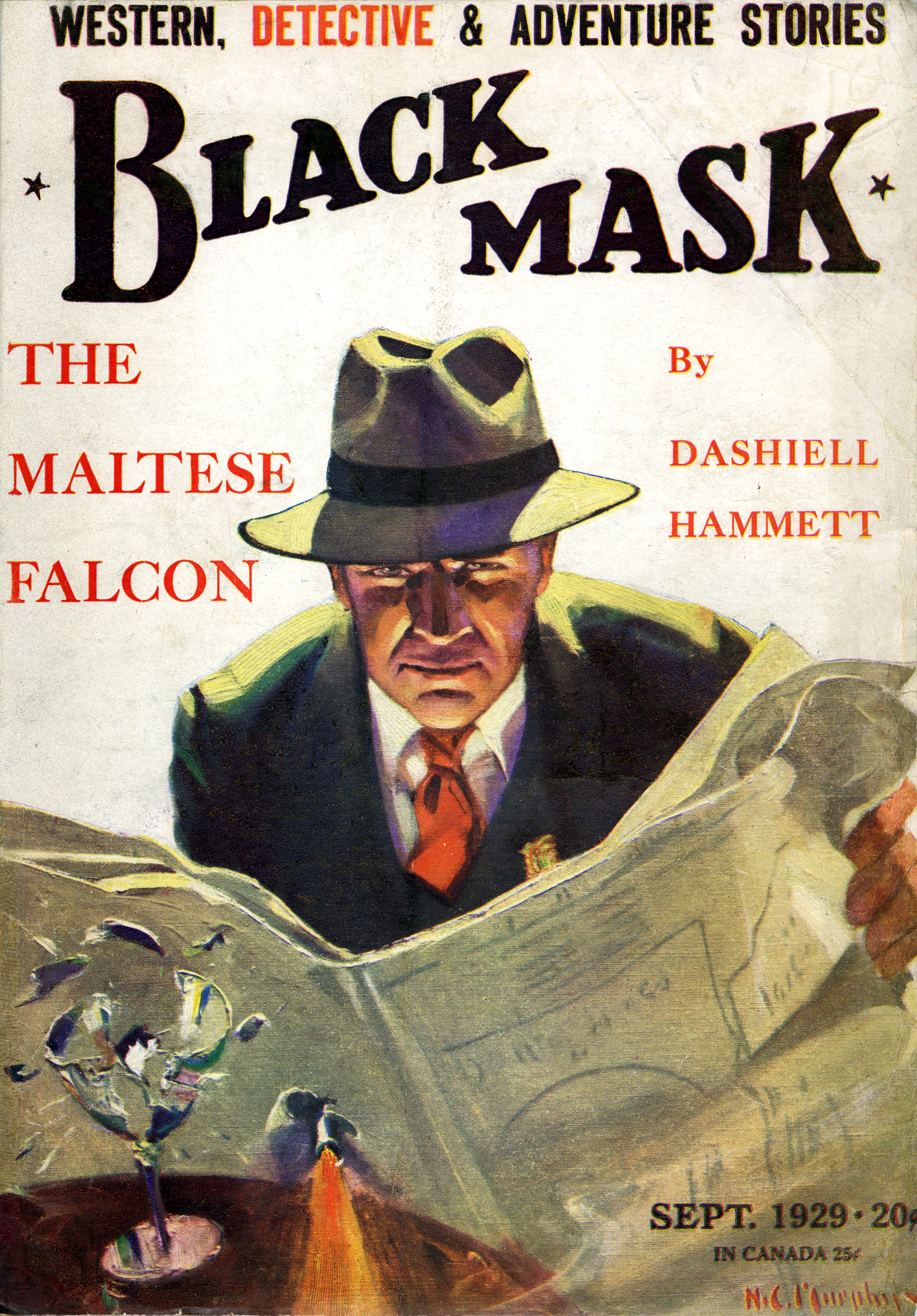
September 1929 cover of Black Mask, featuring part 1 of serialization of The Maltese Falcon. Illustration by Henry C. Murphy, Jr.

Although Hammett himself worked for a time as a private detective for the Pinkerton Detective Agency in San Francisco (and used his given name, Samuel, for the story's protagonist), Hammett asserted that "Spade has no original. He is a dream man in the sense that he is what most of the private detectives I worked with would like to have been, and, in their cockier moments, thought they approached."

Hammett reportedly drew upon his years as a detective in creating many of the other characters for The Maltese Falcon, which reworks elements from some of his stories published in Black Mask magazine in 1925, "The Whosis Kid" and "The Gutting of Couffignal".

=== Serialized version ===
The novel was serialized in five parts in Black Mask from September 1929 to January 1930. The serialized version of the story entered the public domain on January 1, 2025. (Note: The 1930 edition was copyrighted in December 1929.) The book underwent copy edits before being published in book form a year later in 1930 by Alfred A. Knopf. The novel entered the public domain on January 1, 2026.

== Adaptations ==
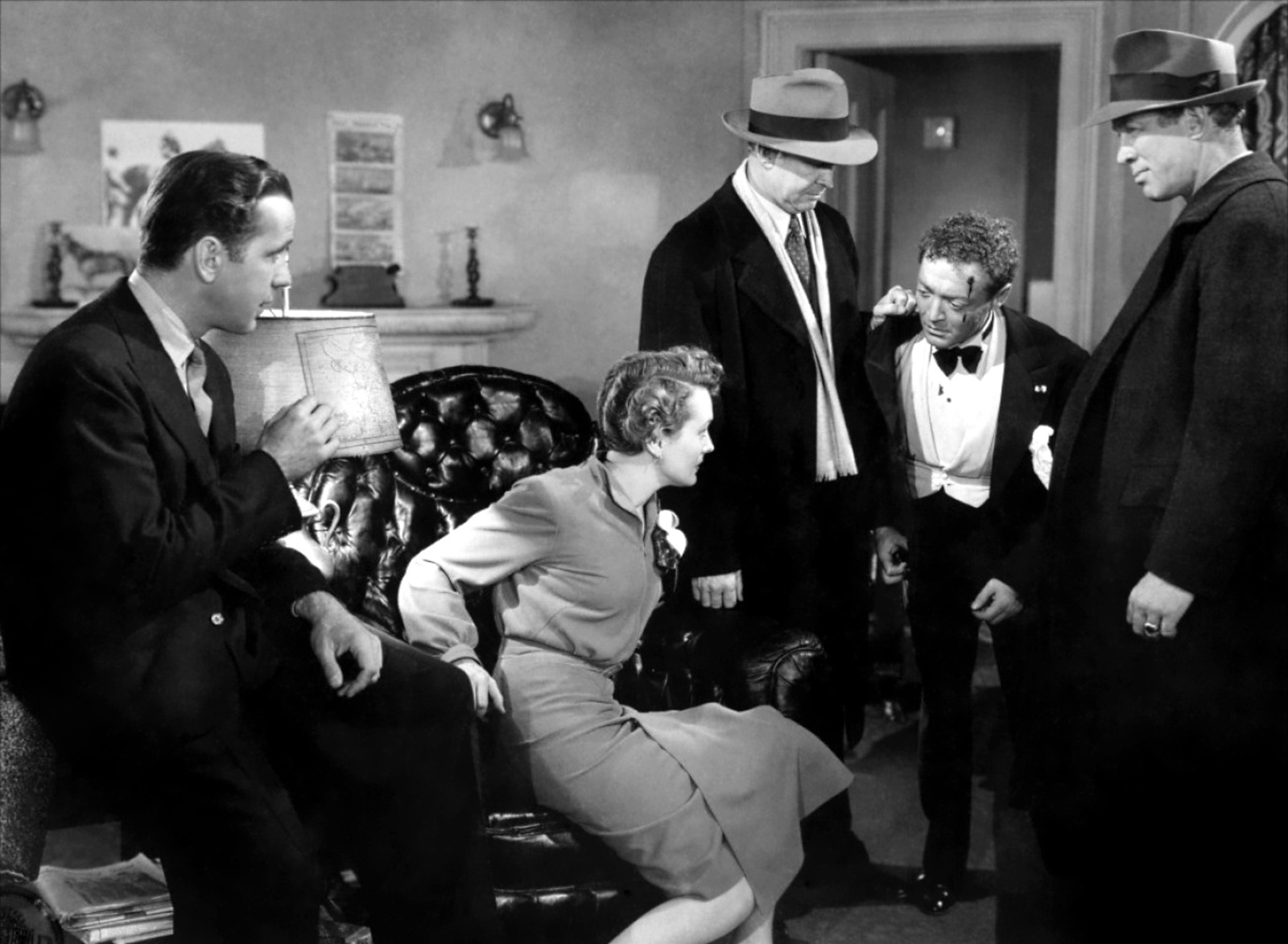
Publicity still for the 1941 film: Left to right: Sam Spade, Miss Wonderly, Police Lt Dundy, Joel Cairo, Tom Polhaus

The novel has received four film adaptations:

- The Maltese Falcon (1931), the first version, a pre-Code production starring Ricardo Cortez as Sam Spade and Bebe Daniels as Ruth Wonderly (that is her alias in the book; she never uses the name Brigid O'Shaughnessy in the 1931 adaptation.) In 1936, Warner Brothers attempted to re-release the film but was denied approval by the Hays Production Code censors because some content was deemed lewd; this led to the production of the 1936 adaptation. It was not until after 1966 that unedited copies of the 1931 film could be shown in the United States.
- Satan Met a Lady (1936), a comedic adaptation starring Bette Davis and Warren William, with Sam Spade becoming "Ted Shane". The film received poor reviews, and Davis later referred to the film as "junk".
- The Maltese Falcon (1941), the third and best-known version, considered to be a film noir classic. This version dropped much of the suggestive content in the 1931 version. The film stars Humphrey Bogart, Mary Astor, Peter Lorre, Sydney Greenstreet, and Gladys George.
- The Black Bird (1975), a spoof sequel, featuring George Segal as Sam Spade Jr. (Elisha Cook Jr. and Lee Patrick reprised their roles from the 1941 film.)
- Just Ask for Diamond (1988), a British comedy crime film which is based on The Falcon's Malteser, a 1986 novel written by Anthony Horowitz and heavily inspired by The Maltese Falcon.

There have been two audio adaptations of the novel:

- The Maltese Falcon (1984), a full-cast dramatization by BBC Radio 4, featuring Jane Lapotaire and Tom Wilkinson.
- Dashiell Hammett's The Maltese Falcon (2008), an audio dramatization by the Hollywood Theater of the Ear.

There have also been American stage adaptations:

- The Maltese Falcon was produced by The Long Beach Shakespeare Company and premiered on April 29, 2005, when Hammett's book was adapted and directed by Martin Pope. Two years later the same company mounted a second adaptation, this one by Helen Borgers, the company's artistic director.
- The Maltese Murder (2008), by playwright Bryan Colley, commissioned by the Johnson County Library in Kansas as part of the National Endowment for the Arts Big Read.

== Reception ==
Alexander Woolcott called The Maltese Falcon "the best detective story America has yet produced." Writing in 1945, critic Edmund Wilson said Hammett "lacked the ability to bring the story to imaginative life."
