= Forever and a Day (novel) =

Novel by Anthony Horowitz

- First edition cover
- Author: Anthony Horowitz
- Series: James Bond
- Genre: Spy fiction
- Publisher: Jonathan Cape
- Publication date: 31 May 2018
- Publication place: United Kingdom
- Media type: Print (hardcover)
- Pages: 304 pp (first edition, hardback)
- ISBN: 978-1911214779

Forever and a Day is a 2018 James Bond novel written by Anthony Horowitz and featuring original material by James Bond creator Ian Fleming.

== Plot ==
A prequel to the events of Casino Royale, the book recounts Bond's first mission as a double-0 agent, his status recently earned by killing a wartime traitor in Stockholm.

Set in the French Riviera in 1950, Bond investigates the killing of the previous man designated 007 and resumes his final mission: determine what is behind the sudden lack of drug activity in the Corsican underworld. He develops his affinity for high-stakes casinos and fine hotels, where he meets Joanne "Sixtine / Madame 16" Brochet, a former British operative who leads him to Corsica mob boss Jean-Paul Scipio. Everything appears to point to the morbidly obese Scipio, head of a chemical company that serves as a front for his heroin business, but Bond discovers a larger network of organised crime and an American multi-millionaire named Irwin Wolfe.

== Background ==
Following the success of Horowitz's first Bond novel, Trigger Mortis, the author and the Fleming estate were both eager to begin work on another. The book was officially announced in October 2016 with a planned Spring 2018 release. It was also announced that the novel would be published by Jonathan Cape, the publisher of Fleming's originals. Like Trigger Mortis, which features a story by Fleming based on previously unpublished material for the unmade James Bond television series, Horowitz would incorporate unused Fleming material in the new story. In February 2018 the title was revealed as Forever and a Day, and it was announced the story would be a prequel to Casino Royale, Fleming's first Bond novel. Fleming's material serves as a story Bond tells Sixtine about a previous escapade he had at the casino where they met.

Horowitz auctioned off a chance to appear in the novel at an auction to support The Old Vic. Reade Griffith was the winning bidder and appears as an American CIA agent in the story. But Joann McPike also made a large donation and was an inspiration for Joanne "Sixtine / Madame 16" Brochet; "brochet" being the French word for "pike".

== Critical reception ==
Steven Poole of The Guardian noted that, contrary to Fleming's choice not to focus on backstory and to deal with Bond as a "fully formed force of nature", Horowitz is "taking a risk in writing" the novel set before Casino Royale. He labelled the book "Bond Begins", a reference to the previously untold origins of Batman in the 2005 Christopher Nolan film Batman Begins, something to which the 2006 film adaptation of Casino Royale was frequently compared. Though he criticised the way some of the classic Bond tropes are introduced in the story, Poole found the book to be "an enjoyably compact thriller, with an absolutely killer last line". Publishers Weekly called the book "entertaining" while noting that Horowitz "delivers a conclusion whose moral complexity will surprise anyone expecting an ending more in line with Fleming's own". Kirkus Reviews called the novel "crisp, unpretentious, and bound to please" fans of the character, but noted that while Horowitz hits all obligatory notes, there's "nothing here that would make the unwary suspect how fiendishly inventive Horowitz can be when he's not laboring in Bond's shadow".
