= Dying of the Light =

Dying of the Light may refer to:

== Literature ==
- A phrase from the poem "Do not go gentle into that good night" by Dylan Thomas
- Dying of the Light (novel), a 1977 novel by George R. R. Martin
- The Dying of the Light (novel), a 1993 novel by Michael Dibdin

== Other media ==
- Dying of the Light (film), a 2014 American psychological thriller
- The Dying of the Light, a 2015 documentary of film presentation through stories by career projectionists
- "Dying of the Light" (Heroes), a 2008 television episode
- The Dying of the Light (Warhammer Fantasy Roleplay), a 1995 role-playing game adventure
- "The Dying of the Light", a 2015 song by Noel Gallagher's High Flying Birds from Chasing Yesterday

== See also ==
- Against the Dying of the Light, a 2001 documentary film
- Skulduggery Pleasant: The Dying of the Light, a 2014 young adult novel by Derek Landy
