= The Alchemist (play) =

Play written by Ben Jonson

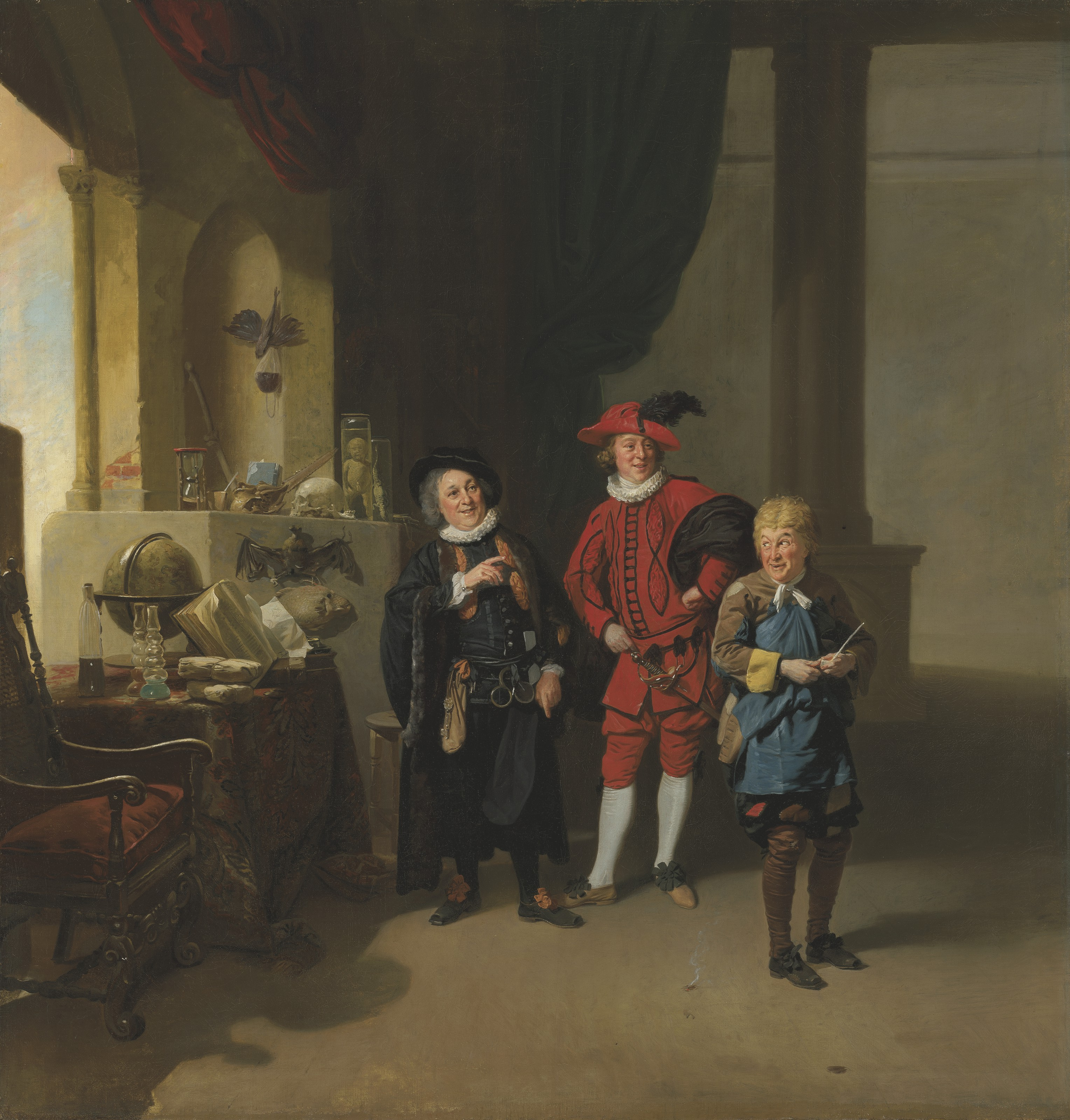
David Garrick as Abel Drugger in Jonson's The Alchemist by Johann Zoffany (c. 1770)

The Alchemist is a verse drama comedy by English playwright Ben Jonson. First performed in 1610 by the King's Men, it is generally considered Jonson's best and most characteristic comedy; Samuel Taylor Coleridge believed that it had one of the three most perfect plots in literature.

== Background ==
The Alchemist premiered 34 years after the first permanent public theatre (The Theatre) opened in London; it is, then, a product of the early maturity of commercial drama in London. Only one of the University Wits who had transformed drama in the Elizabethan period remained alive (this was Thomas Lodge); in the other direction, the last great playwright to flourish before the Interregnum, James Shirley, was already a teenager. The theatres had survived the challenge mounted by the city and religious authorities; plays were a regular feature of life at court and for a great number of Londoners.

The venue for which Jonson apparently wrote his play reflects this newly solid acceptance of theatre as a fact of city life. In 1597, the Lord Chamberlain's Men (a.k.a. the King's Men) had been denied permission to use the theatre in Blackfriars as a winter playhouse because of objections from the neighbourhood's influential residents. Some time between 1608 and 1610, the company, now the King's Men, reassumed control of the playhouse, this time without objections. Their delayed premiere on this stage within the city walls, along with royal patronage, marks the ascendance of this company in the London play-world (Gurr, 171). The Alchemist was among the first plays chosen for performance at the theatre.

Jonson's play reflects this new confidence. In it, he applies his classical conception of drama to a setting in contemporary London for the first time. The classical elements, most notably the relation between Lovewit and Face, are fully modernised; likewise, the depiction of Jacobean London is given order and direction by the classical understanding of comedy as a means to expose vice and foolishness to ridicule. Johnson's play reflects on-going concerns at the time, including the ongoing Second plague pandemic and social inequality.

== Synopsis ==
An outbreak of plague in London forces a gentleman, Lovewit, to flee temporarily to the country. He leaves his house under the sole charge of his butler, Jeremy. Jeremy takes the opportunity to use the house as the headquarters for fraudulent acts. He transforms himself into "Captain Face", and enlists the aid of Subtle, a fellow conman, and Dol Common, a prostitute.

The play opens with a violent argument between Subtle and Face concerning the division of the riches which they have gathered and will continue to gather. Face threatens to have an engraving made of Subtle with a face worse than that of the notorious highwayman Gamaliel Ratsey. Dol breaks the pair apart and reasons with them that they must work as a team if they are to succeed. Their first customer is Dapper, a lawyer's clerk who wishes Subtle to use his supposed necromantic skills to summon a "familiar" or spirit to help in his gambling ambitions. The tripartite suggest that Dapper may win favour with the "Queen of Fairy", but he must subject himself to humiliating rituals in order for her to help him. Their second gull is Drugger, a tobacconist, who is keen to establish a profitable business. After this, a wealthy nobleman, Sir Epicure Mammon, arrives, expressing the desire to gain himself the philosopher's stone, which he believes will bring him huge material and spiritual wealth. He is accompanied by Surly, a sceptic and debunker of the whole idea of alchemy. He is promised the philosopher's stone and promised that it will turn all base metal into gold. Surly however, suspects Subtle of being a thief. Mammon accidentally sees Dol and is told that she is a Lord's sister who is suffering from madness. Subtle contrives to become angry with Ananias, an Anabaptist, and demands that he should return with a more senior member of his sect (Tribulation). Drugger returns and is given false and ludicrous advice about setting up his shop; he also brings news that a rich young widow (Dame Pliant) and her brother (Kastril) have arrived in London. Both Subtle and Face in their greed and ambition seek out to win the widow.

The Anabaptists return and agree to pay for goods to be transmuted into gold. These are in fact Mammon's goods. Dapper returns and is promised that he shall meet with the Queen of Fairy soon. Drugger brings Kastril who, on being told that Subtle is a skilled match-maker, rushes to fetch his sister. Drugger is given to understand that the appropriate payment might secure his marriage to the widow. Dapper is blindfolded and subjected to 'fairy' humiliations; but on the reappearance of Mammon, he is gagged and hastily thrust into the privy. Mammon is introduced to Dol. He has been told that Dol is a nobleman's sister who has gone mad, but he is not put off, and pays her extravagant compliments. Kastril and his sister come again. Kastril is given a lesson in quarrelling, and the widow captivates both Face and Subtle. They quarrel over who is to have her.

Surly returns, disguised as a Spanish nobleman. Face and Subtle believe that the Spaniard speaks no English and they insult him. They also believe that he has come for a woman, but Dol is elsewhere in the building 'engaged' with Mammon, so Face has the inspiration of using Dame Pliant. She is reluctant to become a Spanish countess but is vigorously persuaded by her brother to go off with Surly. The tricksters need to get rid of Mammon. Dol contrives a fit and there is an 'explosion' from the 'laboratory'. In addition, the lady's furious brother is hunting for Mammon, who leaves. Surly reveals his true identity to Dame Pliant and hopes that she will look on him favourably as a consequence. Surly reveals his true identity to Face and Subtle, and denounces them. In quick succession Kastril, Drugger and Ananias return, and are set on Surly, who retreats. Drugger is told to go and find a Spanish costume if he is to have a chance of claiming the widow. Dol brings news that the master of the house has returned.

Lovewit's neighbours tell him that his house had many visitors during his absence. Face is now the plausible Jeremy again, and denies the accusation—-he has kept the house locked up because of the plague. Surly, Mammon, Kastril and the Anabaptists return. There is a cry from the privy; Dapper has chewed through his gag. Jeremy can no longer maintain his fiction. He promises Lovewit that if he pardons him, he will help him obtain himself a rich widow (i.e., Dame Pliant). Dapper meets the "Queen of Fairy" and departs happily. Drugger delivers the Spanish costume and is sent to find a parson. Face tells Subtle and Dol that he has confessed to Lovewit, and that officers are on the way; Subtle and Dol have to flee, empty handed.

The victims come back again. Lovewit has married the widow and claimed Mammon's goods; Surly and Mammon depart disconsolately. The Anabaptists and Drugger are summarily dismissed. Kastril accepts his sister's marriage to Lovewit. Lovewit pays tribute to the ingenuity of his servant, and Face asks for the audience's forgiveness. Jeremy is now left alone to describe the epilogue.

== Analysis ==
In The Alchemist, Jonson unashamedly satirises the follies, vanities and vices of mankind, most notably greed-induced credulity. People of all social classes are subject to Jonson's ruthless, satirical wit. He mocks human weakness and gullibility to advertising and to "miracle cures" with the character of Sir Epicure Mammon, who dreams of drinking the elixir of youth and enjoying fantastic sexual conquests.

The Alchemist focuses on what happens when one human being seeks advantage over another. In a big city like London, this process of advantage-seeking is rife. The trio of con-artists – Subtle, Face and Doll – are self-deluding small-timers, ultimately undone by the same human weaknesses they exploit in their victims. Their fate is foreshadowed in the play's opening scene, which features them together in the house of Lovewit, Face's master. In a metaphor which runs through the play, the dialogue shows them to exist in uneasy imbalance, like alchemical elements that will create an unstable reaction. Barely ten lines into the text, Face and Subtle's quarrelling forces Doll to quell their raised voices: "Will you have the neighbours hear you? Will you betray all?”

The con-artists' vanities and aspirations are revealed by the very personae they assume as part of their plan. The lowly housekeeper, Face, casts himself as a sea captain (a man accustomed to giving orders, instead of taking them), the egotistical Subtle casts himself as an alchemist (as one who can do what no one else can; turn base metal into gold), and Dol Common casts herself as an aristocratic lady. Their incessant bickering is fuelled by vanity, envy and jealousy, the root of which is Subtle's conviction that he is the key element in the 'venture tripartite':

FACE: 'Tis his fault. He ever murmurs and objects his pains, and says the weight of all lies upon him.

The 'venture tripartite' is as doomed as one of the Roman triumvirates. The play's end sees Subtle and Dol resume their original pairing, while Face resumes his role as housekeeper to a wealthy master. Significantly, none of the three is severely punished (the collapse of their scheme aside). Jonson's theatrical microcosm is not a neatly moral one; and he seems to enjoy seeing foolish characters like Epicure Mammon get their comeuppance. This is why, while London itself is a target of Jonson's satire, it is also, as his Prologue boasts, a cozening-ground worth celebrating: "Our scene is London, 'cause we would make known/No country’s mirth is better than our own/No clime breeds better matter for your whore...”

The Alchemist is tightly structured, based around a simple dramatic concept. Subtle claims to be on the verge of projection in his offstage workroom, but all the characters in the play are overly-concerned with projection of a different kind: image-projection. The result, in structural terms, is an onstage base of operations in Friars, to which can be brought a succession of unconsciously comic characters from different social backgrounds, who hold different professions and different beliefs, but whose lowest common denominator – gullibility – grants them equal victim-status in the end. Dapper, the aspirant gambler, loses his stake; Sir Epicure Mammon loses his money and his dignity; Drugger, the would-be businessman, parts with his cash, but ends up no nearer to the success he craves; the Puritan duo, Tribulation and Ananias, never realise their scheme to counterfeit Dutch money.

Jonson reserves his harshest satire for these Puritan characters—perhaps because the Puritans, in real life, wished to close down the theatres. (Jonson's play Bartholomew Fair is also anti-Puritan.) Tellingly, of all those gulled in the play, it is the Puritans alone whom Jonson denies a brief moment of his audience's pity; presumably, he reckons their life-denying self-righteousness renders them unworthy of it. Jonson consistently despises hypocrisy, especially religious hypocrisy that couches its damning judgments in high-flown language. Tribulation and Ananias call their fellow men "heathens" and in one case, say that someone's hat suggests "the Anti-Christ". That these Puritans are just as money-hungry as the rest of the characters is part of the ironic joke.

In many English and European comedies, it is up to a high-class character to resolve the confusion that has been caused by lower-class characters. In The Alchemist, Jonson subverts this tradition. Face's master, Lovewit, at first seems to assert his social and ethical superiority to put matters to rights. But when Face dangles before him the prospect of marriage to a younger woman, his master eagerly accepts. Both master and servant are always on the lookout for how to get ahead in life, regardless of ethical boundaries. Lovewit adroitly exploits Mammon's reluctance to obtain legal certification of his folly to hold on to the old man's money.

== Stage history ==
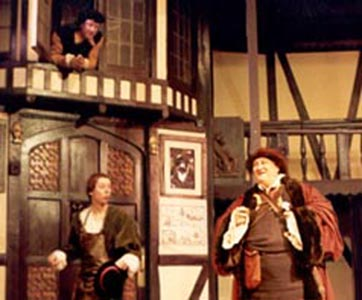
A scene from a Los Angeles theatre production

Internal references indicate that the play was written for performance at Blackfriars; ironically, given its initial scenario, plague forced the company to tour, and The Alchemist premiered at Oxford in 1610, with performance in London later that year. Its success may be indicated by its performance at court in 1613 and again in 1623. Evidence of a more ambiguous kind is presented by the case of Thomas Tomkis's Albumazar, performed for King James I at Cambridge in 1615. A tradition apparently originating with Dryden held that Jonson had been influenced by Tomkis's academic comedy. Dryden may have mentioned Jonson to increase interest in a somewhat obscure play he was then reviving; he may also have been confused about the dates. At any rate, the question of influence now runs the other way. Albumazar is, primarily, an adaptation of Giambattista della Porta's "L'Astrologo"; however, both the similarity in subject matter and Tomkis's apparent familiarity with commercial dramaturgy make it possible that he was aware of The Alchemist, and may have been responding to the play's success.

The play continued onstage as a droll during the Commonwealth period; after the Restoration, it belonged to the repertory of the King's Men of Thomas Killigrew, who appear to have performed it with some frequency during their first years in operation. The play is not known to have been performed between 1675 and 1709, but the frequency of performance after 1709 suggests that it probably was. Indeed, the play was frequently performed during the eighteenth century; both Colley Cibber and David Garrick were notable successes in the role of Drugger, for whom a small amount of new material, including farces and monologues, in the latter half of the century was created.

After this period of flourishing, the play fell into desuetude, along with nearly all non-Shakespearean Renaissance drama, until the beginning of the twentieth century. William Poel's Elizabethan Stage Society produced the play in 1899. This opening was followed a generation later by productions at Malvern in 1932, at the York Festival in 1945 and at The Old Vic in 1947. In the latter production, Alec Guinness played Drugger, alongside Ralph Richardson as Face.

Mark Mirsky directed with "lusty zest" a performance at Harvard's Loeb Drama Center in 1961. Eric Martin's set was considered "original, simple, serviceable, brilliant".

The Oregon Shakespeare Festival staged a fast-paced, nearly farcical production in 1961; Gerard Larson played Face, and Nagle Jackson Face, under Edward Brubaker's direction. The performance received generally favourable reviews; however, a 1973 production set in the Wild West setting did not; the setting was generally considered inconsistent with the tone and treatment of the play.

In 1962, Tyrone Guthrie produced a modernised version at the Old Vic, with Leo McKern as Subtle and Charles Gray as Mammon. Trevor Nunn's 1977 production with the Royal Shakespeare Company featured Ian McKellen as a "greasy, misanthropic" Face, in a version adapted by Peter Barnes. The original was played at the Royal National Theatre, with Alex Jennings as Subtle and Simon Russell Beale as Face, from September to November 2006. A contemporary dress production directed by Michael Kahn opened the 2009/2010 season at the Shakespeare Theatre Company in Washington, DC. Another contemporary dress production was directed by Tariq Leslie and produced by the Ensemble Theatre Co-operative at the Jericho Arts Centre, Vancouver, Canada in the summer of 2012.

The Stratford Shakespeare Festival's 2015 season included a production directed by Antoni Cimolino with Stephen Ouimette as Subtle, Jonathan Goad as Face and Brigit Wilson as Dol.

A new RSC production directed by Polly Findlay and featuring Ken Nwosu as "Face", Hywel Morgan as "Lovewit", Siobhan McSweeney as "Dol" and Mark Lockyer as "Subtle" was scheduled to open at London's Barbican Theatre on 2 September 2016.

The Colorado Shakespeare Festival has scheduled an "Original Practices" performance for its summer 2022 season.

The Southwest Shakespeare Company offered three performances in April 2023 at Taliesen West in Scottsdale, Arizona. The play was presented in the form of a 1940s radio play.

== Publication history ==
A quarto of the play appeared in 1612 published by Walter Burre, printed by Thomas Snodham and sold by John Stepneth.

== See also ==
- Incidental music to The Alchemist (composed by Handel).
- The play is discussed in Margaret Cavendish's The Blazing World (1666).

== Sources ==
- Craig, D. H. Ben Jonson: The Critical Heritage. London: Routledge, 1999.
- Donaldson, Ian. Jonson's Magic Houses: Essays in Interpretation. Oxford: Clarendon Press, 1997.
- Gurr, Andrew. Play-going in Shakespeare's London. 2nd edition; Cambridge: Cambridge University Press, 1996.
- Keenan, Siobhan. Acting Companies and Their Plays in Shakespeare's London. London: Arden, 2014.112-20.
- Lake, Peter, with Michael Questier. The Anti-Christ's Lewd Hat: Protestants, Papists & Players in Post-Reformation England. Yale University Press, 2002.
- Ouellette, Anthony. "The Alchemist and the Emerging Adult Private Playhouse". SEL: Studies in English Literature 1500–1900 45 (2005).
