= Stephen Bayly =

American film producer

- Born: July 7, 1942 (age 83); Baltimore, Maryland, US
- Occupations: Film producer Film director
- Years active: 1969–1997

Stephen Bayly (born July 7, 1942) is an American born British film producer and director. His film Coming Up Roses was screened in the Un Certain Regard section at the 1986 Cannes Film Festival. Bayly was director of the National Film and Television School UK between 1998 and 2003.

== Early life ==
Bayly was born on July 7, 1942, in Baltimore, Maryland, USA. He received his high-school education in the Advanced Program at Baltimore City College from which he graduated in 1960.

== Bibliography ==
- Stephen Bayly, Working with Actors: Meisner Technique for Directors and Actors (London, Bloomsbury) 2023, ISBN 9781350295285
- Stephen Bayly, Acting Realism: from Garrick to Meisner and Beyond (London, Bloomsbury), Nov. 2025 ISBN 9781350320215

== Selected filmography ==
=== Film ===
Year	Title	Role
1986	Coming up Roses	Director
1988	Just Ask For Diamond	Director
1995	Richard III	Producer
1997	Mrs. Dalloway	Producer

=== Television ===
Year	Title	Role	Notes
1976	Nouvelles d’Henry James	Producer, 1 episode: The Author of Beltraffio	TV Series
1982	Joni Jones	Director	TV Mini-series
1984	Aderyn Papur (And Pigs Might Fly)	Director	TV Movie
1991	The Diamond Brothers: South by South East	Executive Producer	TV series
2001	Against the Dying of the Light	Self	Documentary
