= Groosham Grange =

1988 fantasy novel by Anthony Horowitz

- Author: Anthony Horowitz
- Cover artist: Paul Davies
- Language: English
- Series: Groosham Grange
- Genre: Fantasy, adventure fiction, mystery
- Publisher: Methuen Publishing
- Publication date: 1988
- Publication place: United Kingdom
- Media type: Print (hardback, paperback) ebook, audiobook
- Pages: 128
- ISBN: 0-416-10172-0
- Followed by: Return to Groosham Grange

Groosham Grange is a 1988 fantasy novel by English author Anthony Horowitz and the first of two novels in the Groosham Grange series. It follows the adventures of twelve-year-old David Eliot, who gets sent to a mysterious school called Groosham Grange where he eventually learns he is the seventh son of a seventh son. Aimed at a similar audience to that of Horowitz's The Diamond Brothers series, it was partially based on the years Horowitz himself spent at his boarding school and his own unhappy childhood. The novel went on to win the 1989 Lancashire Children's Book of the Year Award and later the French Prix Européen du Roman Pour Enfants ("European Award for Children's Fiction") in 1993.

In 1999, a sequel entitled The Unholy Grail (later reissued as Return to Groosham Grange), was released. Horowitz had always intended for Groosham Grange to be the basis for a series, but he revealed to a fan on Twitter in 2021 that while he did indeed have plans to continue the series with a third book, he was dissuaded after the success of the Harry Potter series.

== Plot ==
David Eliot is a 12-year-old boy who’s arrived home for the Christmas holidays. He has just been expelled from Beton College (a parody of Eton College) and nervously tells his parents the bad news. Upon hearing the news, his father reacts rather badly, forcing David to take refuge in his room to avoid the commotion. The next morning, a letter is delivered to the Eliot household that offers David a place at a mysterious new school that’s bizarrely described having an emphasis on discipline in nearly the exact same way that David’s father was just telling his wife.

After David’s father makes all the necessary arrangements. David is then sent to this new boarding school called Groosham Grange immediately via a train that very same day, despite the fact that it is during the period when schools are closed for the Christmas holidays. On the train, he befriends a boy called Jeffrey and a girl named Jill Green, who are both in the same odd situation as him. Jeffrey was expelled for being caught smoking behind the cricket locker rooms (the misunderstanding being that he was set on fire, not that he was smoking cigarettes). The letter Jeffrey’s parents received describes Groosham Grange as the perfect college for their son, but this time around it is explained that the school is akin to a military training camp. Meanwhile, Jill had just run away from her old boarding school, and her parents also received a letter praising the school's merits and describing it as a chic college for young girls.

As the three children are talking about their new boarding school, a vicar enters their compartment. After playing a number of religious songs (much to the three’s displeasure), he has a heart attack when the three children tell him they are going to attend Groosham Grange, much to their astonishment. On the station platform, they meet Gregor, a hunchback with one eye who is the school’s porter. He drives them to a pier where they take a boat to the island. The ship's captain, Captain Bloodbath, ferries them to Skrull Island (a parody of Skull Island), which is where Groosham Grange is located.

On the island, David is received by Mr. Kilgraw and is told that he must write his name in a book where other names have already been written. Strangely, Mr. Kilgraw makes David injure his thumb while giving him a quill to write with, and David is forced to sign his name into the book with his own blood.

As the days go by, David starts noticing some very weird things about the school. The students are all too well behaved and the staff is made up of some rather odd teachers. Eventually, David and Jill begin to suspect that the students at the school aren’t even using their names, and that their teachers are a monster of some kind, be it a werewolf, a vampire, a mummy and a ghost. Every night, the students also get out of their beds and suddenly disappear from the school without a trace.

== Elements ==
=== Groosham Grange ===
Groosham Grange is a school of evil magic. It is based on a remote island called Skrull Island off the Norfolk coast and even has secret underground passages. It acts as a GCSE school to fool the authorities and even the parents who put their children in Grange are not informed about the involvement of magic. The school consists of teachers who are all mythical creatures. Mr. Kilgraw is the Deputy Headmaster and is a vampire. Mrs. Windergast teaching the subject of "General Witchcraft" is an elderly witch. The school only enrolls the seventh son of a seventh son, or the seventh daughter of a seventh daughter, because they can perform magic. After the son or daughter is found to have been competent enough to continue, they are given a black ring, signifying they can control magic. In fact, all the pupils are forced to sign the admission register with their blood.

== Similarities to Harry Potter series ==
A lot of critics (and Horowitz himself) have since noted certain similarities between the Groosham Grange novel and the newer Harry Potter series written by J. K. Rowling. These similarities include having both central characters being mistreated by their parental figures who receive an unexpected letter from an isolated gothic boarding school which reveals itself as a school for wizards and witches; having a teacher who is a ghost and a werewolf character named after the French word for "wolf" (Lupin/Leloup); and passage to the school via railway train. Talking about the success of his other books, Alex Rider, Horowitz thanked Rowling for her contribution to the development of the young adult fiction in the UK.
