= The Killing Joke =

The Killing Joke may refer to:

== Books ==
- Batman: The Killing Joke, a Batman graphic novel published in 1988
- The Killing Joke (novel), a novel by Anthony Horowitz first published in 2004

== Music ==
- Killing Joke, an English punk rock band formed in 1979
  - Killing Joke (1980 album), their debut album
  - Killing Joke (2003 album), their 2003 album

== Film ==
- Batman: The Killing Joke (film), a 2016 animated feature based on the 1988 graphic novel

== See also ==
- "The Funniest Joke in the World", a Monty Python sketch
- Death from laughter
