= Just Ask for Diamond =

1988 British comedy crime film

- Promotional poster.
- Directed by: Stephen Bayly
- Screenplay by: Anthony Horowitz
- Based on: The Falcon's Malteser
- Produced by: Linda James
- Starring: Dursley McLinden; Colin Dale; Saeed Jaffrey; Patricia Hodge
- Cinematography: Billy Williams
- Edited by: Scott Thomas
- Music by: Trevor Jones
- Production companies: Red Rooster Films; Castle Hill Productions; Coverstop Film Finances; Children's Film Foundation; British Screen
- Distributed by: 20th Century Fox (UK); Miramax Films (US)
- Release date: December 1988
- Running time: 89 minutes
- Country: United Kingdom
- Language: English
- Box office: $12,751

Just Ask for Diamond (released in the United States as Diamond's Edge) is a 1988 British comedy crime film directed by Stephen Bayly, written by Anthony Horowitz and starring Dursley McLinden, Colin Dale, Patricia Hodge and Michael Robbins. It serves as an adaptation of the first novel in The Diamond Brothers book series by Horowitz, The Falcon's Malteser (1986).

The plot is a spoof of film noir, including Dashiell Hammett's 1930 detective novel, The Maltese Falcon. A six-part television series, The Diamond Brothers, exists as a sequel to the film, and was broadcast on ITV in 1991.

== Synopsis ==
The film is set during the Christmas season in Camden Town, London. It follows incompetent private detective Tim Diamond and his sharp-witted teenage brother, Nick, who are completely out of money, until they are hired by a South American client named Johnny Naples to protect a seemingly ordinary box of Maltesers chocolate.

After watching Farewell My Lovely at the cinema, they return to find the office smashed up. Naples is then killed at his hotel room, and the brothers are arrested by the police, led by the frustrated Chief Inspector Snape and his assistant Boyle.

The brothers soon find themselves investigating a mystery involving a hidden fortune of diamonds left by an international criminal named Henry von Falkenberg. Whilst being pursued by various criminals, including a gangster known as "The Fat Man", a pair of German hitmen called Gott and Himmell, and the widowed Brenda von Falkenberg, the brothers work with Naples' fiancée (Lauren Bacardi) to work out the location of the hidden diamonds. Nick is later kidnapped by The Fatman's henchmen, who place him in a bathtub filled with cement, and prepare to carry out a mob-style execution by throwing it into the River Thames. However, the police arrive, forcing The Fatman to escape.

The next morning, Nick and Tim meet with the criminals at Henry von Falkenberg's grave (in which the fortune is hidden). The Fatman, and the two German hitmen shoot each other dead, with Brenda von Falkenberg being arrested by the police before she can kill the brothers. Nick then opens the safe using the barcode on the box of Maltesers, realising that Bacardi had betrayed them by taking the entire stash worth £3.5 million.

However, on Christmas Eve they receive a parcel from Southern France containing a small diamond.

== Production and release ==
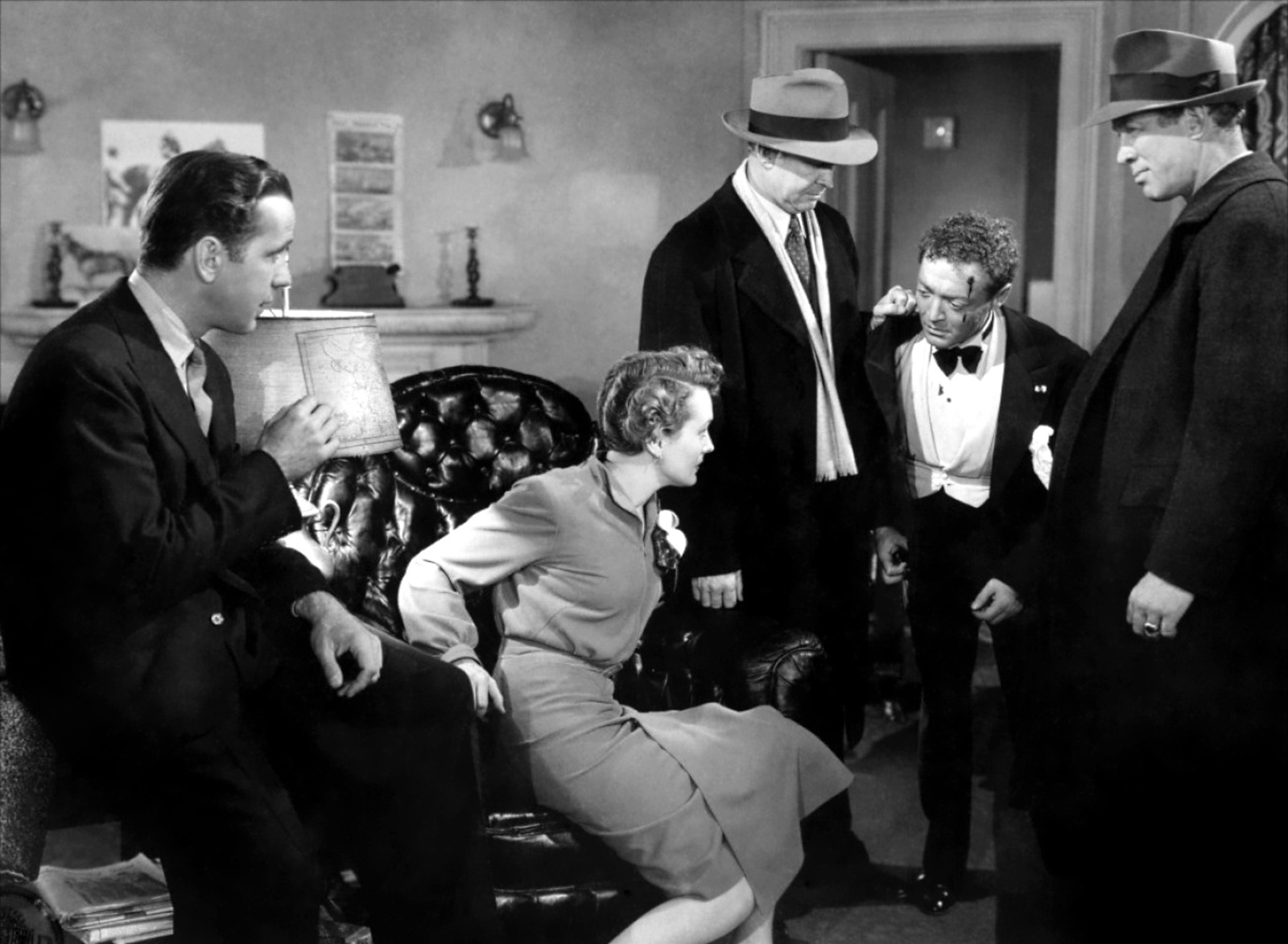
The plot is based on the classic film and novel, The Maltese Falcon.

Just Ask For Diamond was the last film produced by the Children's Film and Television Foundation. The screenplay was based on the novel The Falcon's Malteser (1986), which had quickly become popular in England, and was inspired by Horowitz's favourite film, The Maltese Falcon (1941).

It was filmed on location across London, including at St Pancras railway station and Chalk Farm tube station. The film's musical score was composed by Trevor Jones, which was described as "a sound world for the picture" which reflected its noir style.

Mammoth, a British heavy metal band created by John McCoy, appeared in the film, where they played the henchmen of the "Fatman" (Michael Robbins).

The production was released in the United Kingdom in December 1988, but was poorly received and made little impact at the box office. It later received a United States release via Miramax Films under the alternative title Diamond's Edge, and was edited slightly to tone down some of the narration and violence. The film was also made available on VHS and DVD.

The movie... was a great disappointment. It had a very good cast, but perhaps not enough money behind it, and maybe the wrong director and even a script that could have been better, and certainly a leading child who very much let the side down. His name was Colin Dale.

— Anthony Horowitz

Nigel Floyd of the Monthly Film Bulletin described the film as "a series of absurd misjudgements", and criticised it for not visualising "a more nightmarish edge".

Kevin Thomas reviewed the American release in the Los Angeles Times, writing: "It’s the kind that you might enjoy on videocassette but is not inspired or uproarious enough to justify the effort and money to see in a theatre."

== Cast ==
- Dursley McLinden as Tim Diamond (Herbert Simple)
- Colin Dale as Nick Diamond (Nicholas Simple)
- Bill Paterson as Chief Inspector Snape
- Jimmy Nail as Boyle, Snape's assistant
- Saeed Jaffrey as Mr. Patel, the local grocer
- Susannah York as Lauren Bacardi, a chanteuse (a parody of Lauren Bacall)
- Patricia Hodge as Betty Charlady / Brenda von Falkenberg
- Michael Robbins as The Fat Man
- Roy Kinnear as Jack Splendide
- José René Ruiz as Johnny Naples
- Nickolas Grace as Eric Himmell
- Peter Eyre as William Gott
- Michael Medwin as The Professor
