= The Diamond Brothers: South by South East =

British television programme broadcast in 1991

- The title card for the series.
- Genre: Detective; Action; Comedy
- Written by: Anthony Horowitz
- Directed by: Anthony Horowitz
- Starring: Dursley McLinden; Colin Dale; Monique van de Ven; Michael Gough
- Theme music composer: Michael Storey
- Country of origin: United Kingdom
- Original language: English
- No. of seasons: 1
- No. of episodes: 6

Production
- Executive producers: Stephen Bayly; Linda James; Nigel Pickard; Harry de Winter; Hetty Krapels
- Producer: Richard Turner
- Production locations: London, England; Netherlands
- Running time: 23-24 minutes
- Production companies: TVS; Red Rooster; IDTV; AVRO

Original release
- Network: ITV (TVS)
- Release: 26 March – 30 April 1991
- Network: Disney Channel
- Release: 7 April – 12 May 1993

Related
- The Diamond Brothers; Just Ask for Diamond

The Diamond Brothers: South by South East is a 1991 British six-part comedy drama series produced by Television South for ITV, written and directed by Anthony Horowitz, and starring Dursley McLinden, Colin Dale, Monique van de Ven and Michael Gough. A sequel to the 1988 film Just Ask for Diamond, which is also based on the book series The Diamond Brothers by Horowitz, the series was novelised by Horowitz as South by South East, also published in 1991. The plot and title is a spoof of Alfred Hitchcock's 1959 film, North by Northwest.

== Synopsis ==
The story begins in Camden Town, London, where an incompetent private investigator, Tim Diamond, lives in a flat above his office with his intelligent teenage brother, Nick. The two are completely broke, but their financial trouble seems resolved when a mysterious stranger named Jake McGuffin enters their office. McGuffin reveals he is an MI6 agent tracking a notorious paid assassin codenamed "Charon". Because the brothers' office telephone has been disconnected due to unpaid bills, McGuffin pays Tim £50 for his overcoat to use as a disguise so he can leave without being noticed.

Shortly after McGuffin leaves, Nick notices that the agent has left a hotel room key behind. When the brothers go to find him, they discover McGuffin has been shot inside a nearby telephone box. Before dying, McGuffin mutters his final words to Tim, as a train passes on the bridge overhead, which Nick deduces as "South by Southeast".

The Diamond brothers take over the investigation to find Charon and stop a major international incident. The plot quickly spirals into chaos as the brothers are mistakenly targeted by the police for armed bank robbery, hide in a guest house where the landlady holds them at gunpoint, escape via a train to Amsterdam, machine-gunned by a biplane in a cornfield, and pursued across the countryside by Charon's henchmen.

== Production ==
The cover of the South by South-East novel in 1991.

South by South East was intended as a sequel to the 1988 film Just Ask for Diamond, which was based on the first novel in the Diamond Brothers series created by Anthony Horowitz, published two years prior to the film's release, The Falcon's Malteser (1986). There had been a second novel published the following year, Public Enemy Number Two (1987), however it was considered that some of the plot would have been too violent and impractical to film.

It is not clear whether the series is a direct adaptation of the third novel, South by South-East (1991), or vice versa. The series was produced by Red Rooster Films and IDTV, being sponsored by TVS and AVRO as broadcasters. It was filmed on location in London and Amsterdam, with scenes filmed at Jacob Street Studios.

Horowitz later described the series as "disappointing", and said: "I directed it myself. I wasn't really prepared for that. I had no training, no real idea what I was doing. It was a little bit of a nightmare."

Ron Burrage, a Hitchcock lookalike, makes an inconspicuous appearance in every episode. The exterior of Tim's office and flat was filmed above Chalk Farm station on The London Underground, near Camden Town. In a Radio Times article, Jenny Agutter stated she was invited to play her role, as she had given a 'very favourable review' of Just Ask For Diamond.

In an online article of The Telegraph referencing the series, Horowitz stated that lead actor Dursley McLinden was diagnosed with AIDS shortly after filming was completed.

== Distribution ==
South by South East was originally broadcast from 26 March until 12 May 1991 as part of the CITV block on Tuesday afternoons at around 4:30pm. It later aired in the United States on Disney Channel in 1993.

Following its transmission, the series was neither released on home video nor rebroadcast on television. However, there was a shorter 97 minute version available.

Evidence of the series was confirmed by a British Film Institute (BFI) record of the series as well as a brief mention from Horowitz in the third edition of The Falcon's Malteser. In April 2020, Horowitz wrote on Twitter that he was "quite relieved" that the series was never released.

== Episode list ==
As of the BFI record.

No.	Title	Written by	Original release date
1	"McGuffin"	Anthony Horowitz	26 March 1991 Television South (U.K.); 7 April 1993 Disney Channel (U.S.)
The two brothers are visited by an MI6 agent who tells them of a Dutch agent, 'eighty-six' and a nine-fingered assassin, Charon, who plans to kill a Russian diplomat on British soil. When the two brothers find him dying in a telephone box and hear his last words – "South by south-east". They go to the police and inform DCI Snape and his assistant, Boyle, but when they return with them, the telephone box and the body are gone. After a night locked up for wasting police time, the brothers investigate McGuffin's hotel room. When two men begin searching the room, they escape the hotel and get into a taxi.
2	"Secret Intelligence"	Anthony Horowitz	2 April 1991 Television South; 14 April 1993 Disney Channel
The cab drives them to a covert underground base where the head of MI6, Mr. Waverly, explains to them about Charon's plan to kill Boris Kusenov, a Russian who is flying to England to buy a painting. The two brothers are then gassed and later wake up in the office. They head to Tim's job interview at a bank, where a bomb planted in Tim's briefcase goes off. Wanted for armed robbery, they run off.
3	"Strangers on a Chain"	Anthony Horowitz	9 April 1991 Television South; 21 April 1993 Disney Channel
On the run, they stay in a guesthouse, before visiting a ticket office to find out that the 'Amstel Ijsbaan', a word written on McGuffin's matchbook, is an ice-rink in Amsterdam. When they return, other guests have seen the news and the brothers are handcuffed and held a gunpoint by the owner. The police arrive, but they escape and make their way to Victoria Station. They catch a train and befriend a Dutch woman, Charlotte van Dam.
4	"Eighty-Six"	Anthony Horowitz	16 April 1991 Television South; 28 April 1993 Disney Channel
To avoid the police, the two brothers jump from the train and walk to the ferry in Dover. Reaching the Netherlands, they head to the 'Amstel Ijsbaan' ice rink, and meet Agent 'eighty-six' in the café. He tells them of the 'Villa de Winter' – Charon's countryside house. The brothers then speak to Charlotte by telephone, who tells them to meet her in the Flevoland. They arrive there and spot a low-flying bi-plane which opens fire at them.
5	"The Winter House"	Anthony Horowitz	23 April 1991 Television South; 5 May 1993 Disney Channel
They run into a cornfield to escape the plane. Nick has been injured by a bullet, so they visit Dr. Bloem, a veterinary surgeon who removes the bullet and cleans the wound, She gives them directions to the 'Villa de Winter'. They enter the house, but Tim sets off an alarm and they are chased by two henchmen, Scarface and Ugly. They hide in a nearby windmill and later, make their way to Amsterdam station. When they spot Charlotte, Scarface and Ugly arrive. They split up and Nick runs into a nearby theatre, where he volunteers to enter a magic box, however the magician is replaced by Scarface, brandishing a large dagger.
6	"The Tsar's Feast"	Anthony Horowitz	30 April 1991 Television South; 12 May 1993 Disney Channel
Nick is saved by MI6 agents, who arrest Scarface, and return the two brothers to England. Mr. Waverly closes the case, and clears them of their charges, but when they get back to the office, they discover that Charon has planted a bomb underneath Sotheby's auction house, where the Russian diplomat is bidding, and has swapped the auctioneer's hammer for a trigger. They rush to the auction and disrupt bidding. The police arrive, and Boyle ends up destroying the painting, as he tries to arrest Nick. Later on, Charlotte arrives at their office and reveals that she is Charon, however MI6 agents burst in, once more, and arrest her.

== Cast ==
- Dursley McLinden – Tim Diamond
- Colin Dale – Nick Diamond
- Monique van de Ven – Charon
- Jenny Agutter – Bank Manager
- Anna Massey – Mrs. Bodega
- Michael Gough – Mr. Waverly
- Ron Burrage – Discreet appearance by
- Michael Feast – Chief Inspector Snape
- Gordon Winter – Boyle
- Michael Howe – Jake McGuffin
- Leo Wringer – Ed
- Tim Faulkner – Taxi Driver (Red)
- Frans de Wit – Bulldog
- Rodney Beddal – Scarface
- Boris Isarov – Boris Kusenov
- David Goudge – Ted
- Ed Bauer – Mr. Marvano
- John Bluthal – Mr. Webber
- Peter Copley – Mr. Ferguson
- Nigel Pegram – Police Commissioner
- Edward Hibbert – Sotheby's Assistant
- Marcia Warren – Mrs. Jackson
- Jonathan Coleman – Mr. Blondini
- Thom Hoffman – Hugo Rushmore
- Jos Fluhr – Dr. Monika Bloem
- John Quentin – Auctioneer
- Sally Faber – Television reporter
