= The House of Silk =

2011 novel by Anthony Horowitz

- Author: Anthony Horowitz
- Language: English
- Series: Sherlock Holmes
- Genre: Detective fiction, crime fiction, mystery fiction
- Publisher: Little, Brown & Company
- Publication date: 1 November 2011
- Publication place: United Kingdom
- Media type: Print (hardback & paperback)
- Pages: 294
- ISBN: 0-316-19699-1

The House of Silk is a Sherlock Holmes novel written by British author Anthony Horowitz, published in 2011.

== Plot summary ==
The House of Silk begins with a brief, personal recounting of events by Watson, much like that in A Study in Scarlet by the original author, Sir Arthur Conan Doyle. The reader is informed of the particulars regarding the first meeting of Watson and Holmes, including the circumstances of the Afghan War and a mention of the case that was "too shocking to be revealed until now".

The client of "The Flat Cap case" is introduced as a man by the name of Edmund Carstairs, an art dealer whose paintings had been destroyed by a gang of Irish robbers. After the murder of Carstairs' client, and a failure on the part of a hired detective, he turns to Sherlock Holmes, who employs the aid of the Baker Street Irregulars, and upon locating the hotel wherein the supposed Keelan O'Donaghue (one of the leaders of the gang) is currently staying, one of the newest recruits of the Irregulars, a boy named Ross, is stationed to wait outside until Holmes, Watson, and Mr. Carstairs arrive. When the group finally arrives, Ross appears inexplicably horror-stricken and is later found brutally murdered by the thugs of the House of Silk. When Holmes makes inroads with the House of Silk case, he is framed for murder and sent to prison. Meanwhile, Watson meets with a mystery criminal, later revealed as Professor Moriarty, who provides him with a key to free Holmes from prison, before the detective can be assassinated. Professor Moriarty's motives are uncertain, except that he wishes Holmes to rid the world of the House of Silk, whose activities apparently appall even him. When Watson arrives at the prison, he discovers Holmes has escaped of his own accord, disguised as an aide to the prison doctor, whom he had once helped as a client. Various leads draw them to a travelling funfair, where they are ambushed, before being saved by Lestrade.

The party (Holmes, Watson, Lestrade) makes its way to the "House of Silk", a club operated by a pastor and his wife who also govern a boy's orphanage, and rent the boys to wealthy customers. The members are promptly rounded up by Scotland Yard. Despite their arrests, however, the case does not come to trial, due to a royal family member having been purportedly involved. It is eventually revealed that Mrs. Carstairs is the true person responsible for The Flat Cap case, being the second leader of the Irish gang.

== Critical reception ==
Critical reviews were generally positive. On Anthony Horowitz's official site a review from The Guardian was posted, which said:

So, all of the elements are there: the data, the data, the data. Nothing of consequence overlooked. And yet can Horowitz, like Holmes, make from these drops of water the possibilities of an Atlantic or a Niagara? Can he astonish us? Can he thrill us? Are there "the rapid deductions, as swift as intuitions, and yet always founded on a logical basis" that we yearn for? Emphatically, yes.

== Sequel ==
In 2014, Horowitz published a second installment titled Moriarty. He deliberately chose not to use Holmes or Watson, instead featuring detectives from previous cases, such as Athelney Jones and Lestrade.
