= Dafydd Hywel =

Welsh actor (1945–2023)

- Born: 4 December 1945; Garnant, Wales
- Died: 23 March 2023 (aged 77); Garnant, Wales

Dafydd Hywel (4 December 1945 – 23 March 2023) was a Welsh actor who worked extensively in television roles and films in both Welsh and English medium since 1969. He is best known for playing Glen Brennig in the Sky1 TV comedy drama series Stella.

Dafydd also narrated Video 125s 'The Cambrian Coast' Railway Drivers Eye View Video in 1988.

On 23 March 2023, it was announced that Hywel had died at the age of 77.

== Filmography ==
=== Film ===
Year	Title	Role	Notes
1986	Coming Up Roses	Trevor	Welsh with English subtitles
1984	Yr Alcoholig Llon	Alun	
1987	Milwr Bychan	Sargeant Crane	
1992	Rebecca's Daughters	Rhodri Hughes	
1992	The Christmas Stallion	Christopher Howard	

=== TV ===
Year	Title	Role	Notes
1978	Off to Philadelphia in the Morning	Henry Parry	
1989–1991	We Are Seven	Jamesy James	
2010–2013	The Indian Doctor	Ceri Joseph	
2012–2017	Stella	Glen Brennig	
2019	The Crown	Shopkeeper	Season 3, episode 3 "Aberfan"
