= The Sentence Is Death =

2019 novel by Anthony Horowitz

- First edition (publ. Century Books)
- Author: Anthony Horowitz
- Language: English
- Publication date: 2019

The Sentence Is Death is a 2019 mystery novel by British author Anthony Horowitz and the second novel in the Hawthorne and Horowitz series. The story focuses on solving the murder of a teetotaling solicitor who was murdered with an expensive bottle of wine.

== Synopsis ==
Anthony, the narrator, is once again approached by ex-Detective Inspector Daniel Hawthorne and asked to write about him and a case he is working on, despite the fact that their first collaboration has not been published yet. Although Anthony is not too keen on Hawthorne, the details of the case pique him and he reluctantly agrees to document the case.

== Reception ==
The Sentence Is Death received positive reviews in NPR, NY Journal of Books, and Kirkus Reviews.
