= The Devil and His Boy =

1998 novel by Anthony Horowitz

- First edition
- Author: Anthony Horowitz
- Illustrator: Kyla Bradley
- Cover artist: Kyla Bradley
- Language: English
- Genre: Young adult fiction
- Publisher: Walker Books
- Publication place: United States
- English publication date: 1998

The Devil and His Boy is a 1998 young adult novel by Anthony Horowitz. The book is set in Tudor times and follows the adventures of a young boy as he meets several influential people from that time period.

== Plot ==
The book follows Thomas "Tom" Falconer, a young and somewhat naive boy that works at a pub and is mistreated by his caretakers, Sebastian and Henrietta Slope. He tolerates their abuse with the awareness that there are those worse off than he is. This helps draw the attention of wealthy traveler William Hawkins, who attempts to purchase Tom from his caretakers, who refuse. Meanwhile Sebastian decides to plan with the highwayman Gamaliel Ratsey to steal William's treasure by waiting for him in the woods.

Sebastian later tries to kill William for attempting to steal Tom away to London. William defeats Sebastian but is later killed by Ratsey's ambush. Tom's horse spooks during the encounter and through a series of events, ends up in a pub far from home where he's cared for by the pub's landlord and one of the cooks. He continues on to London, where he sees Ratsey and knows that he is there with the purpose of killing Tom. Tom tries to gain employment, but is horrified by one of the jobs he manages to find, which is to cripple children to gain sympathy while begging. He's later befriended by the thief Moll Cutpurse, who gives him clothes and takes him to the theater, where he meets William Shakespeare.

Tom ends up agreeing to perform in the play The Devil and his Boy for a foreign man named Dr. Mobius, but swiftly notices that something is very strange with Mobius and the other performers. All have a cross tattooed onto their arms and Mobius gives money to a strange disguised man. While rehearsing and preparing for the play, Tom is again attacked by Ratsey and is warned by Mobius's nephew to leave before it's too late. Tom choose to ignore this and later goes on to perform the play for Queen Elizabeth I, who applauds his performance. However the glow from this praise is short lived when Tom realizes that the performing group is actually a group of assassins out to kill the Queen. Tom manages to keep Mobius from assassinating her, only to still be imprisoned in Newgate.

Tom is later saved by the intervention of Ratsey and Moll, who remembers Tom talking about William's last words to him, telling him to go to Moorfield. She realizes that this is the name of a British Lord. They contact the man, who gets the Queen to intervene and save Tom from being executed. It's later revealed that Tom is her grandson, the Queen having had an illegitimate child who was Thomas's father. Tom encourages her to release Mobius's nephew, as he was largely innocent of the crimes against her, and spends the rest of his days acting and living with Shakespeare.

== Reception ==
Critical reception for the book was mostly positive, with the book gaining reviews from the Horn Book Guide and the School Library Journal. Booklist also gave a positive review, praising Horowitz's attempts to ground the more fictional elements of the story in historical fact. A reviewer for Kliatt wrote that the book "rollicking, often fanciful fun ...despite the inclusion of some rather gory details".
