= Gamaliel Ratsey =

English highwayman (died 1605)

Gamaliel Ratsey (died 1605) was an English highwayman of the early 17th century.

== Life ==
He was the son of Richard Ratsey, a well-to-do inhabitant of Market Deeping, Lincolnshire who "took to evil courses as a boy". In 1600 he enlisted in the army which accompanied Sir Charles Blount (afterwards Earl of Devonshire) to Ireland where the Earl of Essex as Lord Lieutenant of Ireland was attempting to put down a rebellion. On returning to England about 1603, Ratsey robbed the landlady of an inn at Spalding of £40, and, when arrested, he escaped from prison and stealing a horse from a serving-man on the road. Later he entered into partnership in Northamptonshire with two reckless thieves named respectively George Snell and Henry Shorthose. Ratsey's exploits on the highway, which were thenceforth notorious, were equally characterised by daring and rough humour. On one occasion he robbed two wool merchants and knighted them by the roadside as Sir Walter Woolsack and Sir Samuel Sheepskin. He usually wore a mask in which the features were made hideously repulsive. Gabriel Harvey referred to him as "Gamaliel Hobgoblin". Ben Jonson wrote in his Alchemist (Act i. Scene 1) of a "face cut … worse than Gamaliel Ratsey's." In Hey for Honesty (1651), assigned to Thomas Randolph, an ugly woman is similarly described. On one occasion Ratsey and his friends successfully robbed a large company of nine travellers. Before he relieved a Cambridge scholar of his property, he extorted a learned oration from him. To the poor, he showed a generosity that accorded with the best traditions of his profession. But within two years his partners betrayed him to the officers of the law, and he was hanged at Bedford on 26 March 1605.

He is the hero of several ballads, none of which is now known, and of two pamphlets, each of which is believed to be extant in a unique copy. One, which is in the Malone collection at the Bodleian Library, was licensed for the press to John Trundle on 2 May 1605. This copy has no title, but it is described in the Stationers' Register as The Life and Death of Gamaliel Ratsey, a famous thief of England, executed at Bedford the 26th of March last past. A portrait of Ratsey, which is no longer accessible, is said to have formed the frontispiece. A poem in Spenserian stanzas headed Ratseys Repentance, which hee wrote with his owne Hand when he was in Newgate, concludes the tract, and, with some vagueness but with much poetical fervour, relates his adventurous life. The popularity of this volume led another publisher, Valentine Simmes, to obtain, on 31 May, a licence for a second part, which he christened Ratseis Ghoaste or the second part of his Madde Prankes and Robberies. It is a collection of imaginary adventures on the road. The only known copy is in the John Rylands Library at Manchester. The most interesting chapter reports a speech which it is pretended Ratsey addressed to the leader of an itinerant company of actors who played before him at a country inn. The speaker advises the actor to perform in London, but, as soon as he has secured a competency, to buy "some place of lordship in the country," and seek dignity and reputation. The actor promises to follow this advice, which is assumed to be an ironical reflection on William Shakespeare and the position he had gained at Stratford-on-Avon.

== In children's literature ==
He is a secondary character, with Moll Cutpurse, in Anthony Horowitz's young adult novel The Devil and His Boy (1998).
