= Return to Groosham Grange =

1999 novel by Anthony Horowitz

- Author: Anthony Horowitz
- Cover artist: Tony Ross
- Language: English
- Genre: Fantasy, adventure fiction, mystery
- Publisher: Walker Books
- Publication date: 1999
- Publication place: United Kingdom
- Media type: Print (hardback, paperback) ebook, audiobook
- Pages: 175
- ISBN: 978-0-7445-8345-8
- Preceded by: Groosham Grange

Return to Groosham Grange is a fantasy novel by English author Anthony Horowitz and the second novel in the Groosham Grange series. It was first published in 1999 under the name The Unholy Grail, but was reissued in 2003 under the new name, Return to Groosham Grange. This change in the title was to help link the two books together.

Return to Groosham Grange serves as a direct sequel to Horowitz's 1988 novel Groosham Grange and mainly revolves around a plot concerning a secret agent of the Bishop of Bletchley trying to destroy the Groosham Grange boarding school once and for all. A second sequel was planned, but Horowitz changed his mind after the success of the Harry Potter series.

== Plot ==
After initially hating Groosham Grange when David arrived almost a year ago, he has decided to accept it. David now realizes that he belongs to this school and has a new goal. He wants to win the school's top prize, The Unholy Grail.

Throughout the year, David had worked hard to earn the most points so he could walk away with the Grail. But three months ago, Vincent King – a new student, had joined the school. Vincent being adaptive, quickly earned points and then stood second in line behind David to win the prize. Seeing Vincent as a rival, David had an instantaneous dislike to the new boy, even though Vincent became very popular.

Finally, when the year was coming to an end and only one test was left (i.e. "Advanced Cursing"), David is relieved to hear that he still has a 30-point lead over Vincent. One day, David witnesses Vincent exiting a tall tower. When David tries to enter the tower, he is spotted by Gregor, the school porter and is thus forced to return to his classes. Convinced that Vincent is up to something, David wants to know what is inside the tower. Being held up by Gregor causes David to be late in class and he loses three points, which gives him a 27-point lead over Vincent.

Afterwards, David starts a fight with Vincent and loses nine more points. But that night, David awakens and notices that Vincent's bed is empty. In the hallway, he thinks he sees Vincent sneak into Mr. Fitch and Mr. Teagle's office. When David enters the room, no one is there except Mr. Fitch and Mr. Teagle who are sleeping on the bed. David spies some paper and picks them up and sees that they are the questions for the "Advanced Cursing" test he is supposed to take the next day. Just as he is putting them down, the office door flies open and Mr. Helliwell caught him. David loses fifteen points, and now Vincent is right behind him in the race for the top prize, with just a lead of one point.

Finally, the "Advanced Cursing" test takes place and Vincent scores one mark higher than him and that settles the score and there's a tie. The correcting teacher, Mr. Kilgraw says that he didn't write one full answer and David is alarmed as he's sure he wrote it. Then, there's a tie-breaker where a blue statuette of Miss Pedicure (another teacher) needs to be recovered from the British Museum without any use of magic. In the end, he manages to solve the cryptic message given by Mr. Kilgraw and finds it. But at the end, wax models from Madame Tussauds attack him and he loses the statuette. Later, he discovers that Vincent got the statuette. Therefore, Vincent's declared the winner of the Unholy Grail. As usual, he suspects Vincent of treachery as he believed Vincent made those wax models to attack him.

When David does finally get into the tower, he finds evidence which claims that someone is trying to destroy Groosham Grange. The agent's plan is to take the Unholy Grail off the island and then to Canterbury which will cause the school to destroy itself. He also sees homing bats in the tower – which he deduces must be sending secret messages to the Bishop of Bletchley. While he's reading, he's suddenly pushed from the window, however he survives as he gets tangled in some vines growing on the walls of the East Tower. David realizes that he must prevent the destruction from happening.

On the day of prize-giving, Vincent is finally awarded the Grail, but as soon as the parents leave from the prize-giving ceremony, sudden destruction occurs. And David thinks Vincent is responsible. So, he ventures into the tower to find out what's happening but then is captured by the agent. Then he finds himself face-to-face with Jill Green, his best friend and Vincent King, his rival. He's ashamed to find that Vincent had not been responsible for anything. The only reason he entered the tower that day was because he smoked. By that time, Eliot had guessed who did this.

He took off on Mrs. Windergast's broomstick and found the Unholy Grail with Mr. Helliwell near the Canterbury Church. The pieces of the puzzle start fitting in together. It was Mr. Helliwell who was collecting the test papers – so he just removed the sheet with the answer. He was the one who had made the wax models to attack him and he's of course the agent. He had met the Bishop of Bletchley at Haiti who had reformed him and under his instructions had tried to destroy Groosham Grange. Somehow formulating a plan, David manages to get the Grail and returns it to the school. However, for personal purposes, he then decides to leave the school for good.

== Characters ==
=== Main characters ===
- David Eliot – He is the protagonist of the story. He has been at Groosham Grange for almost a year and at first hated it upon discovering its dark secret about evil magic. He had fought with the school authorities and tried to escape but in vain. He also despised the teachers. Note that the teachers were all mythical creatures. Some of them were wizards, witches, werewolves and vampires. After a year at the school, he realizes that he was destined to come here as he was the seventh son of a seventh son and thus suitable to possess magic. He now accepts the school and tries to come first on the league table by getting the most points. The book involves him in a twist where he believes something fishy going on with another student, Vincent King who had arrived recently and was just below him on the points' table.
- Jill Green – David's best friend. She was very sad to find that David had cheated on Sports' Day. She also supported Vincent, righteously where he was actually not responsible but still David suspected him.
- Vincent King – He is the suspected antagonist in the story but is actually not. He had joined the school during David's second year and in 3 months he had adapted to everything and was just below David on the points' table. However, Eliot still had a 30-points lead. Suddenly, everything changes when David's points starts to fall due to his errors. David thinks all the mistakes he made were nothing but intricate traps laid by Vincent. In the end, he realizes it was all a misunderstanding.
- Mr. Helliwell – The voodoo teacher at Groosham Grange. He is the actual antagonist of the novel. Mr. Helliwell had joined the school at around the same time as Vincent King. He is the one who is the secret agent of the Bishop of Bletchley. He was actually an evil black magic wizard, however when he went to Haiti for a vacation, he met the Bishop who then drastically reformed him and asked him to destroy the school hosting evil magic, Groosham Grange. He had then laid traps and then designed them in such a way, that David always thought Vincent was responsible. He had actually pushed David out of the tower window. He was the one who sent those wax models to attack him. And he was the one who had actually opened the safe and kept the question papers of the test on the desk to frame David. He was also the one who removed one of David's answer sheet making him lose 35 marks. He had also managed to ship the Unholy Grail out of Skrull Island onto Canterbury but at the last moment David defeated him.

=== Minor characters ===
- Mr. Kilgraw – The deputy headmaster who also happens to be a vampire.
- Edward and Eileen Eliot – David Eliot’s rather eccentric parents. While seemingly rather well off, Edward Eliot's recent purchase of a brand new specially converted orange Rolls-Royce (Mr. Eliot can’t walk so the car was modified so that he’ll still be able to drive) has put a burden on their finances. He is also under the impression that just because the UK forms part of Europe (the novel was written before Brexit), it means that he should drive on the right side of the road instead of on the left, just like in other European countries.
- Aunt Mildred: David's aunt, who is also one of Edward Eliot’s six siblings. She is a widow because her husband had recently died from sheer boredom of living with her. She is rather talkative and also has a rather odd fixation with anything Japanese-related.
- Mr. Teagle and Mr. Fitch – They are the school heads. They possess the same body but have two distinct heads.
- Mrs. Windergast – She's an elderly witch who became the school matron after her husband died, and also doubles as the "General Witchcraft" teacher. She was burned at the stake twice; once during the reign of King John and another time in 1332.
- Miss Pedicure – Miss Pedicure is a mummy who existed since time began. It was her blue statuette which was to be recovered from the British Museum during the tie-breaker challenge.
- Gregor – A alarmingly deformed hunchback who works as the school’s porter and handyman.
- Captain Bloodbath: The captain who ferries the parents over to Groosham Grange for Parents’ Day. After losing both of his hands in the first book, he now has a pair of metal ones that some students made for him out of aluminium in their metalwork class.
- Jeffrey – A major character in the first book, he is only briefly mentioned in the beginning of the novel during the Sports Day race.

== Elements ==
=== The Unholy Grail ===
The Unholy Grail is a cup of immeasurable evil magical power given to the star pupil (i.e. the one who scores the most points and is at the top of the league table) every year at Groosham Grange. It contains red stones on the outer wall which are either rubies or carbuncles. It's kept hidden in a passageway below Skrull Island with a magical iron fence guarding it.

== Abandoned sequel ==
In May 2021, Horowitz revealed some details to a fan on Twitter about the plot of the abandoned third Groosham Grange novel. Horowitz briefly explained that the novel would have essentially followed David as he travelled the world on his own, just as he had promised to Mr. Kilgraw at the end of Return to Groosham Grange. As of May 2021, Horowitz has no plans to revisit the series.
