= Moriarty (novel) =

Book by Anthony Horowitz

- Author: Anthony Horowitz
- Language: English
- Series: Sherlock Holmes
- Genre: Detective fiction, crime fiction, mystery fiction
- Publisher: Orion Publishing Group
- Publication date: 23 October 2014
- Publication place: United Kingdom
- Media type: Print (hardback & paperback)
- Pages: 320
- ISBN: 978-1-4091-0947-1

Moriarty is a Sherlock Holmes novel written by author Anthony Horowitz and published in 2014. It is the follow-up, but not a sequel, to his previous novel The House of Silk.

== Plot ==
Moriarty takes place in 1891 after the events of Sir Arthur Conan Doyle's "The Final Problem". Scotland Yard detectives with whom Holmes worked in previous cases, such as Athelney Jones and Lestrade, also appear in the novel. The novel follows Pinkerton Detective Agency operative Frederick Chase and Det. Insp. Athelney Jones as they try to prevent a new criminal mastermind from taking over the streets of London after Moriarty's demise.

== Critical reception ==
Laura Miller writing for The Guardian thought "Moriarty is a sound mystery novel, with traps, disguises and a good if not exactly unprecedented twist, but whether it scratches the Holmesian itch is another matter." Holly Cuthbert of the Worcester News thought the novel a simplistic crime story that was inferior to Horowitz's previous novel The House of Silk, lacking the same depth.
