= The Word Is Murder =

2017 mystery novel

First edition (publ. Century)

The Word Is Murder is a 2017 mystery novel by British author Anthony Horowitz and the first novel in the Hawthorne and Horowitz series. The story focuses on solving the murder of a woman who was involved in a hit-and-run accident ten years previously.

== Synopsis ==
Anthony, the narrator (a fictionalized version of the author), is approached by ex-Detective Inspector Hawthorne, with whom he worked on a television series. Hawthorne, who is in need of money, proposes that Anthony write a book about him and one of the cases he is working on in exchange for a 50/50 split of the advance and royalties. The case involves a woman who, six hours after planning her own funeral, is found murdered. Initially reluctant, Anthony agrees and proceeds to document Hawthorne’s solution of the case.

== Reception ==
The Word Is Murder received positive reviews in the Bookreporter, The Wall Street Journal, and Kirkus Reviews.

In May 2021 the Japanese edition of The Word Is Murder won the Best Translated Honkaku Mystery of the Decade (2010-2019).
