= Mindgame (play) =

Play by Anthony Horowitz

Mindgame by Anthony Horowitz is a psychological thriller play set in a mental hospital. The play was first performed in 1999 in Colchester before transferring to the West End. It was published by Oberon Books in 2000. A highly fictionalized account of the London production of this play is the backdrop to Horowitz’s novel, The Twist of a Knife (2022).

== Plot ==
Mark Styler, a writer of "true crime" stories arrives at the Fairfields experimental hospital for the criminally insane, with the hope of interviewing serial killer Easterman for a new book. He meets Dr. Farquhar, the hospital director, however things don't seem quite right. The doctor is reluctant to let Styler see Easterman, and encourages Styler to leave. Styler, however refuses with the excuse of a long car journey. In the end, he stays and Farquhar offers him dinner. His assistant Nurse Paisley seems frightened of something, and is anxious. She tries to give a note to Styler, but Farquhar burns it in the bin. She reluctantly makes a pot of tea and liver sandwiches for Styler. After she leaves, the two discuss the book further, but Styler's real feelings about Easterman are revealed. He is desperate to see Easterman, and suggests that he wore a strait-jacket to keep him from damaging anything. Farquhar, seemingly annoyed at this, retrieves a strait jacket from a closet and offers to put it on Styler to show what it is like, and he reluctantly agrees. Once Styler is strapped in, Farquhar taunts him about being mad, and threatens him with a scalpel, then Nurse Paisley returns, and she knocks Farquhar unconscious with a wine bottle. She explains that Farquhar is in fact Easterman, who killed most of the staff during a "psychiatric drama" session. Nurse Paisley is in fact Doctor Carol Ennis. She cannot undo the strait jacket straps, and as she bends down to get the scalpel from Easterman, he awakens and grabs her, then stabs her behind a curtain. When Easterman and Styler begin to talk, it turns out the two men used to be neighbours, and Styler admired Easterman, perhaps even loved him. It appears Styler's motives for visiting are not as they appeared to be. Doctor Ennis suddenly awakens, and cries out for help; Easterman straps her to a chair and after removing the jacket, asks Styler to kill her. Styler is tricked into thinking he is Easterman, and they think up various methods, but in the end Styler suffocates her with a carrier bag. Once it is done, he feels guilt but Ennis awakes and now assumes the role of Doctor Farquhar. She and Farquhar, who is now Carol, completely change, and Styler is told he is Easterman and Styler was just his assumed name. He tries to prove them wrong, however his BMW is gone, and the letter he sent to Farquhar is blank. In the end, Styler is forced to believe he is Easterman, however it is never explicitly revealed to the audience who is actually who.

== Performances ==
Mindgame premiered at the Mercury Theatre, Colchester on 2 September 1999, before transferring to the Vaudeville Theatre in London's West End in 2000. That production was directed by Richard Baron. On 9 November 2008, the play premiered Off Broadway in New York City starring Keith Carradine as Dr. Farquhar and directed by Ken Russell, who made his New York City directorial debut with the production. The production closed on 28 December 2008. Another run of performances took place at the Ambassadors Theatre in London in 2018, following a UK tour.

== Characters ==
=== Seen ===
- Mark Styler, a writer of true crime stories, who also wrote in memory of his mother. He comes to Fairfields hoping to interview a serial killer for a new book.
- Doctor Farquhar, the director of the hospital. He is relatively new to the hospital, and is trying to turn it around.
- Nurse Paisley, Farquhar's nurse.

=== Unseen ===
- Borson, a security guard.
- Victoria Barlow, Styler's mother.
- Easterman, a notorious serial killer whom Styler wants to investigate.
