= Coming Up Roses (1986 film) =

1986 film directed by Stephen Bayly

- Film poster
- Directed by: Stephen Bayly
- Written by: Ruth Carter
- Produced by: Linda James
- Starring: Dafydd Hywel
- Cinematography: Dick Pope
- Edited by: Scott Thomas
- Release date: May 1986
- Running time: 93 minutes
- Country: United Kingdom
- Language: Welsh

Coming Up Roses (Welsh: Rhosyn a Rhith) is a 1986 Welsh language comedy film. It was produced by Red Rooster Films for the Welsh language channel, S4C. Directed by Stephen Bayly, it starred Dafydd Hywel, Gillian Elisa and Mari Emlyn. The film was screened in the Un Certain Regard section at the 1986 Cannes Film Festival.

The film is set in the aftermath of the 1984-85 miners' strikes. It centres on the closure of the last small town cinema in South Wales and the efforts of the janitor, and former projectionist, Trevor, and the usher, Mona, to raise funds by growing mushrooms in the dark, to pay off the cinema's debts. The New York Times' film critic, Vincent Canby, noted that the film's setting, the "economically depressed town of Aberdare in south Wales" illustrates the Margaret Thatcher government's impact not only on coal mining but local communities, more generally, due to the knock-on effects of unemployment.

The film was noteworthy in that it was the first Welsh language film to receive a UK theatrical release in 1987. As well, it was one of two Welsh language films being screened in the London's West End cinemas with English subtitles. The other Welsh language film on West End screens was Milwr Bychan or Boy Soldier. It is also noteworthy in that it was the only British film in 1986 to be screened at the Cannes Film Festival in Cannes, France.

In August 2024, the National Eisteddfod, an annual celebration of Welsh culture, was held in Pontypridd close to Aberdare. The programme featured a pop-up cinema, Sinemaes, which screened Coming Up Roses, followed by a panel discussion.

In November 2017, media & publishing company Whales Online listed Coming Up Roses as #41 in its "Top 50 greatest Welsh Films" opinion piece.

== Plot ==
"Coming Up Roses" centers on the protagonist who is left facing harrowing debts after the closure of the local cinema. Through elusive schemes, and comedic attempts, he finds ways to escape the debt, and keep the cinema alive for a struggling populations off the South Wales coast.

== Cast ==
- Dafydd Hywel as Trevor
- Iola Gregory as Mona
- Gillian Elisa as Sian
- Mari Emlyn as June
- Ifan Huw Dafydd as Dave
- Rowan Griffiths as Pete
- Olive Michael as Gwen
- Bill Paterson as Mr. Valentine
- W. J. Phillips as Eli Davies
- Clyde Pollitt as Councillor

== Production ==
The film was originally made for television for the Welsh-language broadcaster S4C and shot on 16mm. It was later converted to 35 mm to release for theatre. A reflection of the social and economic impact of the 1984-85 miner' strikes in South Wales, it measures symbolism and draws parallels between small town mining communities intertwined with cinema.

The film was produced under the production company, Red Rooster Film & Television Entertainment with S4C collaborating as a joint venture.

The film was shot at Aberdare, a small town in the Cynon Valley area of Rhondda Cynon Taff, Wales.

- Director: Stephen Bayly
- Screenplay: Urien William & Ruth Carter
- Cinematography: Dick Pope
- Music Nigel Bouton & Micheal Storey

== Soundtrack ==
The soundtrack of the film combined original compositions blended with musical theatre to reflect the film's social commentary, and comedic aspect. The music score was composed by Nigel Bouton, creating original songs such as "I'm Your Doctor" and "We All Have to Play the Blues Sometimes".

The film also incorporated "Everything's Coming Up Roses" from the 1959 musical Gypsy: A Musical Fable. Its music was composed by Jule Styne, written by Stephen Sondheim while performed by Rosalind Russell.

== Release ==
The film was released on January 1, 1986 with a runtime of 90 minutes. It was rated PG with an audience rating of 9.2 out of 10 upon release. However, it failed at the box office, collecting only $4,299 against a budget of $1.1 million.

== Reviews ==
Released as the first Welsh language film to receive a UK theatrical release in 1987, The New York Times described the film as "sweetly daffy" while film critic Philip French from Observer regarded it as a "funny, observant film". While Rotten Tomatoes provided a 92% audience rating on the film.

== Awards/Nominations ==
The film received several recognitions at major film festivals and two nominations following its release. It was nominated for the Un Certain Regard Award at the 1986 Cannes Film Festival for director Stephen Bayly and the Gold Hugo for Best Feature Film in the same year.

It also won jury awards at the Perrot D'Or Swiss Comedy Festival in Vervey and the International Children's Film Festival in Chicago.

== Legacy/Cultural Impact ==
In 2024, the National Eisteddfod cultural festival of Wales featured a screening of "Coming Up Roses" at a pop-up cinema in Pontypridd. Panel host, RTS Cymru Wales discussed and reviewed the long lasting impact of the film on Welsh culture and history.
