= The Night of the Scorpion =

1985 book by Anthony Horowitz

- Author: Anthony Horowitz
- Language: English
- Series: The Pentagram
- Release number: 2nd in series
- Genre: Fantasy novel, adventure novel, thriller novel, Horror fiction
- Publisher: Patrick Hardy Books (UK)
- Publication date: 4 January 1985 (UK); 1 November 1988 (US)
- Publication place: United Kingdom
- Media type: Print Hardback
- Pages: 160 pp
- ISBN: 0-7444-0053-8 (Hardback edition)
- Preceded by: The Devil's Door-Bel
- Followed by: The Silver Citadel

The Night of the Scorpion is the second book in the Pentagram series by British author Anthony Horowitz. It was published and released in the United Kingdom on 4 January 1985 by Patrick Hardy Books and 1 November 1988 in the United States by Putnam Pub Group. Initially envisioned as a pentalogy, only the first four books in the series were ever written and published.

Between 2005 and 2012, Horowitz released an updated and re-imagined version of each of the first four books in the series, along with a fifth book to conclude the series. This series was marketed instead as The Power of Five (re-titled as The Gatekeepers in the US). The book which The Night of the Scorpion forms the basis of was released in 2006 under the name Evil Star.

== Plot summary ==
After the events of the previous novel, The Night of the Scorpion follows Martin Hopkins and journalist Richard Cole as they travel together to Peru, only to immediately get separated and chased by a sinister Mr Todd. As Martin befriends a mysterious stranger called Pedro, they end up getting caught up with precognitions, ancient secrets, artificial satellites, and the mysterious Nazca Lines in the Nazca Desert.

== Reception ==
Dave Langford reviewed The Night of the Scorpion for White Dwarf #80, and stated that "it seems a pretty feeble Ultimate Evil of the Universe which, as here, can be sent packing by the direct attack of two psychic kids. Evil should be made of sterner stuff ...."

== Reviews ==
- Review by Muriel R. Becker (1985) in Fantasy Review, August 1985
- Review by Graham Andrews (1986) in Paperback Inferno, #62
