= The Diamond Brothers =

Series of children's books by Anthony Horowitz

- The Falcon's Malteser (1986); Public Enemy Number Two (1987); South By South East (1991); The French Confection (2002); I Know What You Did Last Wednesday (2002); The Blurred Man (2002); The Greek Who Stole Christmas (2007); Where Seagulls Dare (2022)
- Author: Anthony Horowitz
- Illustrator: Tony Ross
- Cover artist: Martin Chatterton
- Country: United Kingdom (UK)
- Language: English
- Genre: Detective novel, thriller (Adventure, action)
- Publisher: Grafton; Walker Books; Puffin (US, CAN); Philomel Books (US)
- Published: 1986–present
- Media type: Print (hardback & paperback); DVD; VHS; Audio CD
- No. of books: 8
- Website: https://www.anthonyhorowitz.com/books/list/series/diamond-brothers

The Diamond Brothers is a series of humorous children's detective books by Anthony Horowitz. the stories feature an incompetent private detective, Tim Diamond, and his more intelligent younger brother, Nick Diamond.

The series currently comprises four full-length novels, four novellas and one short story. A fifth full-length novel entitled The Radius of the Lost Shark is being planned. The books are aimed at a younger readership than Horowitz's young adult novels, such as the Alex Rider series and The Power of Five series.

The entire series was re-issued in 2007 with new cover art designed by illustrator Martin Chatterton, and again in 2015 illustrated by Tony Ross.

== Publications ==
=== Novels ===
- The Diamond Brothers in... The Falcon's Malteser (1986), Tim Diamond (whose real name is Herbert Timothy Simple) is hired by a South American dwarf named Johnny Naples to protect a mysterious box of Maltesers. The next day, Naples is found dead. Tim is framed for the crime, whilst his smarter younger brother Nick secures the box of Maltesers, which several dangerous criminals are looking for. The title and plot of the novel are in part a spoof of The Maltese Falcon.
- The Diamond Brothers in... Public Enemy Number Two (1987), Nick Diamond is framed by the police for a jewel heist he didn't commit, in order to force him to go undercover as a jewel thief and discover true identity of an unknown master criminal known only as "The Fence". To do that, he needs to befriend a very unstable teenage crook called Johnny Powers. Meanwhile, Tim has been hired to find a Ming vase called the Purple Peacock that has been stolen from the British Museum, whilst also having to help Nick and Johnny break out of prison. The title is a both a reference to and a spoof on the term public enemy number one.
- The Diamond Brothers in... South By South East (1991), the Diamonds are once again forced into a mystery, this time going to Amsterdam to discover the identity of the mysterious assassin referred to as Charon. The investigation leads to have many hair-raising adventures, including one in which they are chased by a small plane in a scene reminiscent of Hitchcock's classic film North by Northwest, of which the book's title is a reference to and the book's plot spoofs.
- The Diamond Brothers in... Where Seagulls Dare (2022), set three months after the events of The Blurred Man, a glamorous woman hires the Diamond Brothers to find her missing father, but they are caught up in a case involving bike-riding hitmen, hackers and a sinister far-right organisation called the White Crusaders. It is the first full-length Diamond Brothers novel since the release of South by South East in 1991. Horowitz published the first seven chapters unedited on his website (which have since been removed) throughout 2020 during the COVID-19 lockdown, with the full, edited novel published in May 2022. While Horowitz initially stated that profits from the novel would go towards the National Health Service, profits will instead go to a NGO called Suffolk Home-Start, of which he is a patron. The title is a spoof of the film Where Eagles Dare.

=== Novellas ===
- The Diamond Brothers in... The French Confection (2002), the Diamond Brothers win a holiday to Paris, but accidentally get caught up in a drug smuggling ring and are forced to team up with the Sûreté to take them down. The plot and title is based on The French Connection.
- The Diamond Brothers in... I Know What You Did Last Wednesday (2002), seven friends, along with the Diamond Brothers, are invited to a remote island for a school reunion. But then the host is found dead, and other people start dying in bizarre ways with no way off the island. The plot itself is a spoof of the Agatha Christie novel And Then There Were None, whilst the title is a spoof of the film I Know What You Did Last Summer.
- The Diamond Brothers in... The Blurred Man (2002), the Diamond Brothers investigate the sudden and mysterious death of a charitable philanthropist who suffers chronic allergies that prevent him from meeting almost anyone in person. The book's title and plot is a spoof of the film The Third Man.
- The Diamond Brothers in... The Greek Who Stole Christmas (2007), when famous Greek pop singer and movie star named Minerva begins receiving anonymous death threats, her husband decides to hire Tim Diamond (along with Nick) to protect her. The title is a spoof of the Christmas children's story How the Grinch Stole Christmas! written by Dr. Seuss. The story was adapted and enlarged from a radio play of the same name that Horowitz wrote several years prior.

=== Short stories and collections ===
- The Double Eagle Has Landed (2011): A short story in which the Diamond Brothers are hired to protect a valuable gold coin. It was published in Guys Read: Thriller, edited by Jon Scieszka. The title is a spoof of the film The Eagle Has Landed.
- Three of Diamonds (2004): A compilation of The French Confection, I Know What You Did Last Wednesday and The Blurred Man. The three stories were first released in this edition, before subsequently being sold as separate books.
- Four of Diamonds (2008): Similar to Three of Diamonds, but also includes The Greek Who Stole Christmas.

=== Planned works ===
The promotional blurbs of the early 2004 editions of the Alex Rider novel Scorpia, and of an early edition of Three of Diamonds claimed that Horowitz was planning an Australian-based adventure for the Diamond Brothers, entitled The Radius of the Lost Shark (a play-on-words on the film title Raiders of the Lost Ark). This title was also mentioned in a promotional blurb at the end of early 2005 edition of the Alex Rider novel Ark Angel, and again in the introduction to the re-issued 2007 edition of Three of Diamonds.

The title was also mentioned in-story at the end of The Greek Who Stole Christmas. Following the main plot events, Nick and Tim finally managed to earn enough money to be able to fly out to Australia to visit their parents for the first time since they had emigrated there, prior to the events of The Falcon's Malteser. Nick suggests that he might one day write down what happened during their visit to Australia and that he might call the book The Radius of the Lost Shark. This prompted fan speculation that the novel's release might be imminent, but when Horowitz was asked in July 2012 on Twitter by a fan when this book might come out, he replied that he had not started on the book yet, and that he probably won't get around to it for "…another 3 years". In March 2015, Horowitz then stated in an interview that there would be at least another six books written by him before continuing The Diamond Brothers series.

In December 2015, when responding to a fan query on Twitter regarding the plot of the book, Horowitz revealed that the story would be set during the Australian summer, and that it may involve the characters celebrating Christmas in July. In February 2017, when another fan asked Horowitz on Twitter about the status of The Radius of the Lost Shark, he replied that he still fully intends to write it, and that he is "… waiting for the four months I need to write it". In April 2020, when the fourth full-length Diamond Brothers novel Where Seagulls Dare was announced, it was assumed that the novel would have some relation to the Australian-based adventure alluded to at the end of The Greek Who Stole Christmas, but Horowitz quickly confirmed on Twitter that this was not so, and that The Radius of the Lost Shark has still yet to be written. In 2022, Horowitz reiterated that the book would be written "no time soon".

== Adaptations ==
Just Ask for Diamond (1988), is a film adaptation based on the first novel The Falcon's Malteser, published two years prior. It stars Dursley McLinden and Colin Dale as Tim and Nick Diamond respectively. In the North American market, the film was instead released under the name Diamond's Edge. The film has subsequently been released on VHS and DVD.

The Diamond Brothers: South by South East (1991) is a six-part television mini-series, written and directed by Horowitz as a sequel to Just Ask For Diamond. The screenplay is based on the third novel South by South East, and it aired on ITV in 1991, with McLinden and Dale reprising their respective roles from the preceding film.

== See also ==
- Alex Rider
- Just Ask for Diamond
- The Diamond Brothers: South by South East
