= Trigger Mortis =

Book by Anthony Horowitz

- First edition cover
- Author: Anthony Horowitz
- Cover artist: Joy Cohn
- Series: James Bond
- Genre: Spy fiction
- Publisher: Orion Publishing
- Publication date: 8 September 2015
- Publication place: United Kingdom
- Media type: Print (hardcover, e-book, audio)
- Pages: 320 pp (first edition, hardback)
- ISBN: 978-1-4091-5913-1

Trigger Mortis is a 2015 James Bond novel written by Anthony Horowitz, and commissioned by the estate of Bond's creator Ian Fleming, which was published on 8 September 2015.

== Plot ==
The book is set in 1957 against the backdrop of the Space Race, and begins two weeks after the events of Goldfinger. The novel is the third in the current-era literary series to be set during the original timeline created by Fleming since 1968's Colonel Sun (following Devil May Care by Sebastian Faulks and Solo by William Boyd) and sees the return of Bond girl Pussy Galore, who made her debut in Goldfinger.

== Background ==
Trigger Mortis was announced in October 2014. It contains Murder on Wheels, previously unpublished material written by Fleming for an unfilmed television series, which Horowitz used to write the opening chapter. The book title was revealed on 28 May 2015 to coincide with Fleming's 107th birthday.

== Critical reception ==
Sarah Ditum from The Guardian noted that Horowitz's previous experience with the Alex Rider series had allowed him to "[slip] in almost seamlessly" into the "Fleming chapter", allowing him to deliver the "tersely precise prose that makes Bond so compelling" and supply "touches of Fleming’s cruel poetry". She felt that problems only arose when Horowitz "deviates from the model", especially with Pussy Galore's substantial backstory and Bond's personality divergence from the previous books. Barry Forshaw of The Independent described the book as a "clever and enjoyable pastiche" which manages to "press many of the buttons that were the purview of [Fleming]". Writing for London Evening Standard, Nicholas Lezard took delight in the "bonkers but hugely enjoyable" story, which has "everything in it we want from Bond [...]". Lezard complimented the villain's "plausible backstory" and Bond's escape scenes, which had him "appropriately, given his situation, gasping for breath". Scott Murray from The Sydney Morning Herald compared Horowitz's writing style to Fleming, stating: "Mostly, he writes as if he were Fleming. [...] Trigger Mortis is a Bond novel no one else could have conceived and written except for Fleming in his prime." He noticed that after the "gripping and tense" Grand Prix scenes, the book "hardly takes a breath or allows the reader the time or desire to look for misjudgments", while only suffering from a few description errors with Bond's observations. Simon Schama, writing for the Financial Times, praised the "humdinger of a Bond story, so cunningly crafted and thrillingly paced that 007's creator would have been happy to have owned it", and described it as a "Loving Tribute" to Fleming.

Felix Salmon from The New York Times observed that Horowitz's setting of Bond, notably with his personality, "isn't — could never be — the same Bond" as Fleming's original. He also noticed that the novel was bogged down with "dutiful" descriptions of technology and lack of research in certain parts of the prose, but nevertheless complimented the story's plot which "should be more than good enough for the fans." On the other hand, Muriel Dobbin of The Washington Times praised the technical detail in the daredevil car racing and space rocket scenes, noting that "Mr. Horowitz obviously did his technical homework". She particularly enjoyed the story's ending, writing: "[...] Bond shines. And so does his Bentley. It’s all great fun." The Daily Telegraph's Jake Kerridge praised the "authentically Fleming-esque storyline" of the book, notably the SMERSH racing storyline, but felt that the book's formulaic Bond girl and villain ultimately proved underwhelming.

== Adaptations ==
In August 2015 it was announced that an audiobook of the novel would be narrated by actor David Oyelowo. The BBC Radio 4 drama series Book at Bedtime broadcast a serialized reading by Rupert Penry-Jones in October and November 2015.
