= Anthony Horowitz =

English novelist and screenwriter (born 1955)

Anthony Horowitz CBE
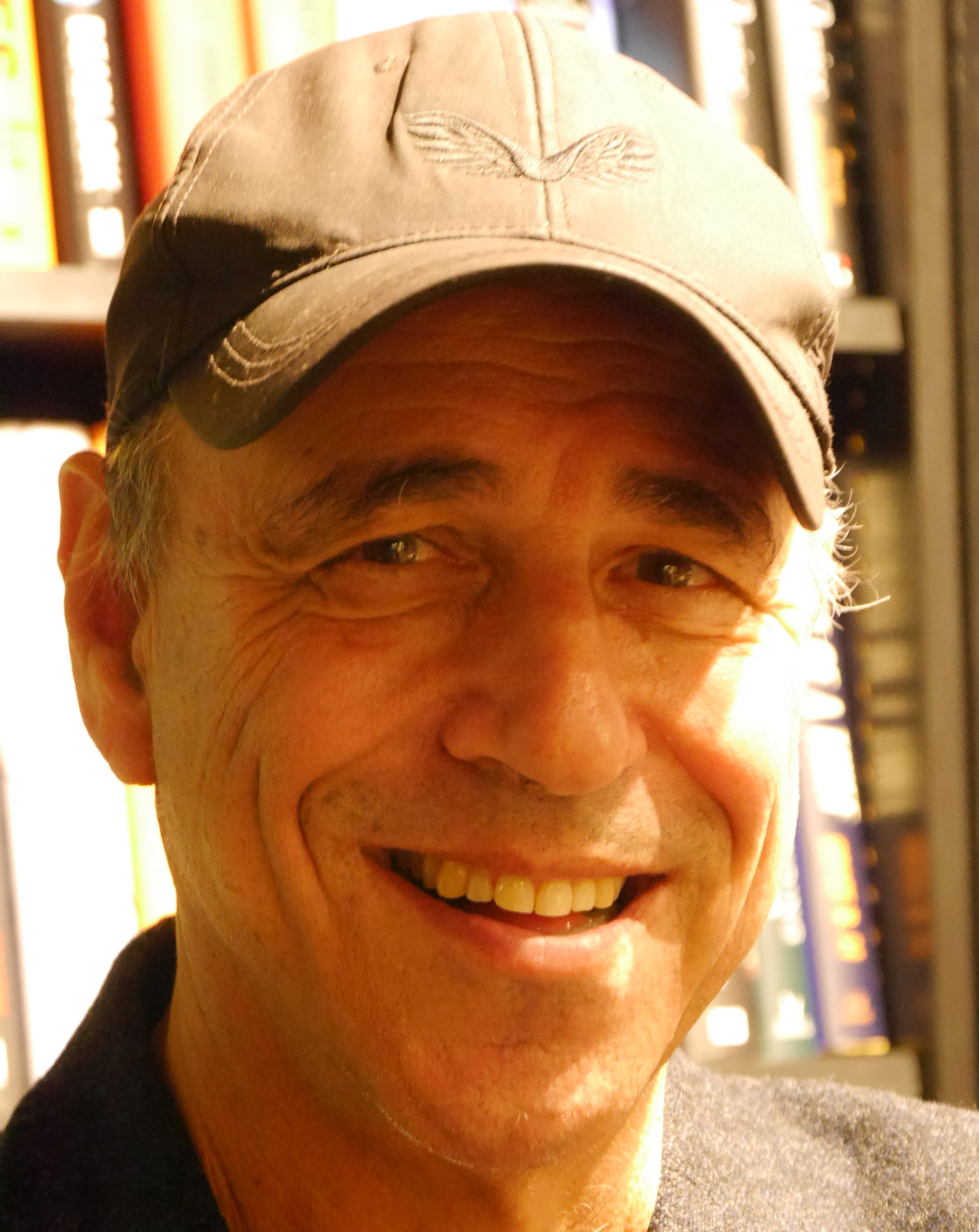
- Horowitz in 2022
- Born: Anthony John Horowitz; 5 April 1955 (age 71); Stanmore, Middlesex, England
- Education: Vanbrugh College, York
- Occupations: Novelist, screenwriter, children's author & adult author
- Spouse: Jill Green (m. 1988)
- Children: Nicholas; Cassian
- Writing career
- Genres: Adventure, mystery, thriller, horror, fantasy
- Notable works: Alex Rider; The Power of Five; The Diamond Brothers; Foyle's War; The House of Silk; Magpie Murders
- Website: anthonyhorowitz.com

Anthony John Horowitz (born 5 April 1955) is an English novelist and screenwriter specialising in mystery and suspense. His works for children and young adult readers include the Alex Rider series featuring a 14-year-old British boy who spies for MI6, The Power of Five series (known as The Gatekeepers in the US), and The Diamond Brothers series.

Horowitz's works for adults include: the play Mindgame (2001); two Sherlock Holmes novels, The House of Silk (2011) and Moriarty (2014); three novels featuring his own detectives Atticus Pünd and Susan Ryeland: Magpie Murders (2016), Moonflower Murders (2020) and Marble Hall Murders (2025); six novels featuring a fictionalised version of himself as a companion and chronicler to private investigator Daniel Hawthorne: The Word Is Murder (2017), The Sentence Is Death (2018), A Line to Kill (2021), The Twist of a Knife (2022), Close to Death (2024) and A Deadly Episode (2026).

The estate of James Bond creator Ian Fleming chose Horowitz to write Bond novels utilising unpublished material by Fleming, starting with Trigger Mortis in 2015, followed by Forever and a Day in 2018, and a third and final novel With a Mind to Kill in May 2022.

Horowitz has also written for television, contributing scripts to ITV's Agatha Christie's Poirot and adapting six early episodes of Midsomer Murders from the novels of Caroline Graham, including the first three episodes. He was the creator and writer of the ITV series Foyle's War, Collision and Injustice, and the BBC series Crime Traveller and New Blood.

== Early life ==
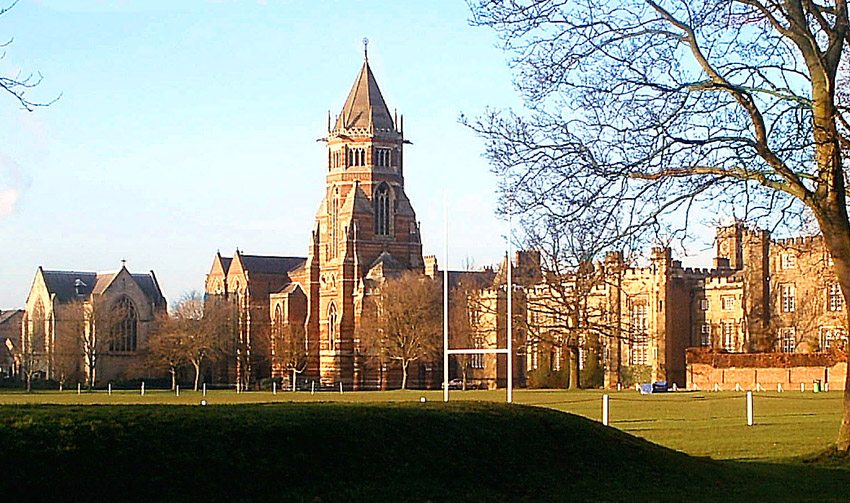
Rugby School in Warwickshire

Horowitz was born in Stanmore, Middlesex, into a Jewish family, and in his early years lived an upper middle class lifestyle. As a child, Horowitz used to go to Instow, where his nanny took him boating on the River Torridge.

Horowitz attended Orley Farm School. He started writing at the age of eight or nine and he instantly knew he would be a professional writer. This was because he was an underachiever in school and was not physically fit, and found his escape in books and telling stories. In a 2006 interview, Horowitz stated "I was quite certain, from my earliest memory, that I would be a professional writer and nothing but."

At age 13 he went to Rugby School, a public school, in Rugby, Warwickshire, which he described in a postscript to his novel With a Mind to Kill as "foul". He graduated from the University of York with a lower second class degree in English literature and art history in 1977, where he was in Vanbrugh College.

Horowitz's mother introduced him to Frankenstein and Dracula. She gave him a human skull for his 13th birthday. Horowitz said in an interview that it reminds him to get to the end of each story since he will soon look like the skull.

Horowitz's father was associated with some of the politicians in the "circle" of Prime Minister Harold Wilson, including Eric Miller. Facing bankruptcy, he moved his assets into Swiss numbered bank accounts. He died from cancer when Horowitz was 22, and the family was never able to track down the missing money despite years of trying. This left the family bankrupt, requiring the sale of the large family home.

== Literary career ==
=== Early literary work (1979–1991) ===
Horowitz's first book, The Sinister Secret of Frederick K Bower, was a humorous adventure for children that was published in 1979 and later reissued as Enter Frederick K Bower in 1985. In 1981 his second novel, Misha, the Magician and the Mysterious Amulet was published and he moved to Paris to write his third book.

In 1983, the first novel in the Pentagram series was released. Entitled The Devil's Door-Bell, the story saw thirteen-year-old Martin Hopkins trying to adjust to a new life with a foster mother on a Yorkshire farm, but it quickly becomes a nightmare when he ends up having to battle an ancient evil that threatens the whole world. Only three of the four remaining novels in the series were ever released: The Night of the Scorpion (1984), The Silver Citadel (1986) and Day of the Dragon (1986).

In 1985, he released Myths and Legends, a collection of retold tales from around the world. He was also involved in writing scripts for the cult 1980s television series Robin of Sherwood and a novelisation, The Hooded Man.

In 1988, Groosham Grange was published. Its central character is a thirteen-year-old "witch", David Eliot, gifted as the seventh son of a seventh son. This book went on to win the 1989 Lancashire Children's Book of the Year Award. Some similarities have been noted between this book and J. K. Rowling's later Harry Potter series, but Horowitz did not choose to take action because of this.

The most important release of Horowitz's early career was The Falcon's Malteser (1986). This book was the first in the successful Diamond Brothers series, and was followed in 1987 by Public Enemy Number Two, and by South by South East in 1991.

=== Early children's fiction success (1992–1999) ===
Horowitz wrote many stand-alone novels in the 1990s. His 1994 novel Granny, a comedy thriller about an evil grandmother, was Horowitz's first book in three years, and it was the first of three books for an audience similar to that of Groosham Grange. The second of these was The Switch, a body swap story, first published in 1996. The third was 1997's The Devil and His Boy, which is set in the Elizabethan era and explores the rumour of Elizabeth I's secret son.

In 1999, The Unholy Grail was published as a sequel to Groosham Grange. It was later renamed Return to Groosham Grange in 2003, possibly to help young readers understand the connection between the two books. In 2021, Horowitz revealed to a fan on Twitter that he had plans to write a third book, but was dissuaded after the success of the Harry Potter series. In the same year, Horowitz published a collection of several short horror stories aimed for children and young adults, entitled Horowitz Horror (1999). This was an opportunity for Horowitz to further explore a darker side of his writing.

Horowitz attempted to reach an adult audience with a novel called Poisoned Pen. The novel is based around Martin Holland, who is a childhood friend of a 21st century incarnation of William Shakespeare. In the novel, William Shakespeare is reimagined as a Hollywood screenwriter who is murdered in a set of circumstances that Martin Holland finds rather odd, despite attempts from a Los Angeles detective to dissuade him. The novel follows Martin's attempts to solve the ever-growing mystery through a series of rather unusual circumstances and a number of people who seem rather glad that Shakespeare was murdered. The novel has never been published in the UK or even in English, but copies in Spanish and Dutch have been released (retitled as El asesinato de Shakespeare and William S. respectively). As of June 2021, despite Horowitz's recent successes in adult literature, there are no plans to get the novel republished.

=== Mainstream children's fiction success (2000–2010) ===
Horowitz began his most famous and successful series in the new millennium with the Alex Rider novels. These books are about a 14-year-old boy becoming a spy, a member of the British Secret Service branch MI6. As of 2024, there are eleven books where Alex Rider is the protagonist, and another connected to the Alex Rider series: Stormbreaker (2000), Point Blanc (2001), Skeleton Key (2002), Eagle Strike (2003), Scorpia (2004) Ark Angel (2005), Snakehead (2007), Crocodile Tears (2009), Scorpia Rising (2011), plus Russian Roulette (2013). Horowitz had stated that Scorpia Rising was to be the last book in the Alex Rider series prior to writing Russian Roulette about the life of Yassen Gregorovich, but he has returned to the series with Never Say Die (2017), secret weapon (2019), Nightshade (2020) and Nightshade Revenge (2023).

In 2003, Horowitz also wrote three novellas featuring the Diamond Brothers: The Blurred Man, The French Confection and I Know What You Did Last Wednesday, which were republished together as Three of Diamonds in 2004. The author information page in early editions of Scorpia and the introduction to Three of Diamonds claimed that Horowitz had travelled to Australia to research a new Diamond Brothers book, entitled Radius of the Lost Shark. This claim was further backed up when a new Diamond Brothers novella entitled The Greek who Stole Christmas! was released in 2007, where it is hinted at the end that Radius of the Lost Shark may turn out to be the eighth entry in the series. However, the next novel in the series was instead called Where Seagulls Dare, and is unrelated to the Australian-based adventure that was previously announced. Horowitz published the first six chapters unedited on his website throughout 2020, and the full, edited novel was published in 2022, with all profits going to support the NHS.

Horowitz also published two sequels to his short horror story collection; More Horowitz Horror (2000) and More Bloody Horowitz (2009). Many of the stories in Horowitz Horror and More Horowitz Horror were later repackaged in twos or threes as the Pocket Horowitz series, while More Bloody Horowitz was later reissued as Scared to Death. One of the short stories in More Bloody Horowitz is notable for serving as Horowitz's opportunity to get even with fellow author Darren O'Shaughnessy, more commonly known as Darren Shan. In 2008, the pair had gotten into a joke dispute over O'Shaughnessy's use of Horowitz's name for an objectionable character (Antoine Horwitzer) in Wolf Island. In retaliation, Horowitz chose to plot a gruesome literary revenge in the short story The Man Who Killed Darren Shan.

In 2004, Horowitz again attempted to branch out to an adult audience with The Killing Joke, a comedy about a man who tries to track a joke to its source with disastrous consequences. The book was not very successful, and in August 2005, Horowitz returned to young adult fiction by releasing a book called Raven's Gate which began a second successful series entitled The Power of Five (The Gatekeepers in the United States). Based heavily on one of his earlier novels entitled The Devil's Door-Bell, each of the first four entries of The Power of Five subsequently ended up being a rewritten and expanded version of their respective counterpart from the Pentagram series. The second book in the series, Evil Star (based on The Night of the Scorpion), was released in April 2006. The third in the series is called Nightrise (based on The Silver Citadel), and was released on 2 April 2007. The fourth book Necropolis (based on Day of the Dragon) was released in October 2008. The fifth and final book, the only one not based on an earlier Pentagram novel, was released in October 2012 and is called Oblivion. Horowitz describes this series as "Alex Rider with devils and witches".

In October 2008, Horowitz's play Mindgame opened Off Broadway at the SoHo Playhouse in New York City. Mindgame starred Keith Carradine, Lee Godart, and Kathleen McNenny. The production was the New York stage directorial debut for Ken Russell.

In March 2009 he was a guest on Private Passions, the biographical music discussion programme on BBC Radio 3.

=== Continued success (2011–present) ===
On 19 January 2011, the estate of Arthur Conan Doyle announced that Horowitz was to be the writer of a new Sherlock Holmes novel, the first such effort to receive an official endorsement from them and to be entitled The House of Silk. It was both published, in November 2011 and broadcast on BBC Radio 4. A follow-up novel, Moriarty, was published in 2014.

In October 2014, the estate of Ian Fleming commissioned Horowitz to write a James Bond novel, Trigger Mortis, which was released in 2015. It was followed by a second novel, Forever and A Day, which came out on 31 May 2018. A third novel entitled With a Mind to Kill was released on 17 May 2022. Horowitz is the only author in recent years to have been invited by Ian Fleming Publications to write successive, official James Bond novels.

In 2016, Horowitz's adult novel Magpie Murders was published. Having previously spoken about the book in 2005, it was initially described as being about "a whodunit writer who is murdered while he's writing his latest whodunit". Horowitz finally finished it in late 2015, and it was published in October 2016. A follow-up novel, Moonflower Murders, was released in 2020. A third and final novel in the series, Marble Hall Murders, was released in April 2025.

In 2017, Horowitz began a new series of detective novels which includes himself as a novelist enlisted by an out-of-work detective called Hawthorne to write books about the way Hawthorne solves crimes. The fictional Horowitz accompanies Hawthorne as he investigates murders committed in London and other locations. So far, starting with The Word is Murder, six of these books have appeared, with two others commissioned.

In 2011, Horowitz tweeted that he had plans to write a new trilogy for the same demographic as his Alex Rider and Power of Five books, but that it's still "a secret". During 2012 and 2013, Horowitz tweeted out some more information regarding the series, where he stated that it will be "a completely new genre" from anything else he'd done so far, and that it will have a contemporary setting in modern-day London with a 15-year-old protagonist. He also revealed that it's tentatively entitled The Machine. However, Horowitz revealed in 2021 that he has yet to begin writing this series and that he has no immediate plans to do so.

== Film and television career ==
=== Film ===
Horowitz wrote the screenplay for Just Ask for Diamond, a 1988 film adaptation of his Diamond Brothers novel The Falcon's Malteser that had an all-star cast which included Bill Paterson, Jimmy Nail, Roy Kinnear, Susannah York, Michael Robbins and Patricia Hodge, and featured Colin Dale and Dursley McLinden as Nick and Tim Diamond respectively.

Horowitz is the writer of a feature film screenplay, The Gathering, which was released in 2003 and starred Christina Ricci.

He wrote the screenplay for Alex Rider's first major motion picture, Stormbreaker.

=== Television ===
Horowitz began writing for television in the 1980s, contributing to the children's anthology series Dramarama, and also writing five episodes of the third season for the popular fantasy series Robin of Sherwood. He also novelised three of Carpenter's episodes as a children's book under the title Robin of Sherwood: The Hooded Man (1986).

In addition, he created Crossbow (1987), a half-hour action adventure series loosely based on William Tell. This era in Horowitz's career also saw the release of Adventurer (1987), a thriller about a convict stuck on a prisoner ship with his sworn enemy based on the Richard Carpenter series, and Starting Out (1990), a collection of screenplays by the author himself, published.

His association with murder mysteries began with the adaptation of several Hercule Poirot stories for ITV's popular Agatha Christie's Poirot series during the 1990s. Often his work has a comic edge, such as with the comic murder anthology Murder Most Horrid (BBC Two, 1991) and the comedy-drama The Last Englishman (1995), starring Jim Broadbent.

In 1991, The Diamond Brothers, a six-part television series written and directed by Horowitz himself, was broadcast on ITV. The series is based on the book South by South East, which Horowitz claimed he wrote after he had written the television series, effectively making South by South East a novelisation of the television series rather than the novel acting as the primary source of inspiration. Both McLinden and Dale reprised their respective film roles, which makes the television series act as a sequel to Just Ask for Diamond.

From 1997, he wrote the majority of the episodes in the early series of Midsomer Murders. In 2001, he created a drama anthology series of his own for the BBC, Murder in Mind, an occasional series which deals with a different set of characters and a different murder every one-hour episode.

He also created two short-lived science-fiction shows, Crime Traveller (1997) for BBC One and The Vanishing Man (pilot 1996, series 1998) for ITV. While Crime Traveller received favourable viewing figures it was not renewed for a second season, which Horowitz accounts to temporary personnel transitioning within the BBC.

In 2002, Horowitz created the series Foyle's War, a historically-themed detective series set during and after the Second World War. The series became the longest-running among Horowitz's television projects, with a total of 28 episodes broadcast over eight series between 2002 and 2015.

Horowitz devised the 2009 ITV crime drama Collision and co-wrote the screenplay with Michael A. Walker.

Horowitz adapted his novel Magpie Murders into a television miniseries, which aired on BritBox and later BBC One in the UK and on the PBS series Masterpiece Mystery! in the US.

Filming commenced on the Canary Islands in the spring of 2024 on his television series Nine Bodies in a Mexican Morgue.

== Personal life ==
Horowitz lives in Central London (Clerkenwell) with his wife Jill Green; they eloped to be married in Hong Kong on 15 April 1988. Green produced Foyle's War, the series Horowitz wrote for ITV, and other television shows he has written. They have two sons.

Horowitz credits his family with much of his success in writing, as he says they help him with ideas and research. Horowitz is a patron of the Museum of Richmond and a patron of the family support charity Home-Start in Suffolk.

Politically, Horowitz has described himself to be "vaguely conservative". Ahead of the 2010 United Kingdom general election, Horowitz stated he would vote for the Conservative Party in response to the policies of the governing Labour Party, but "with little enthusiasm." In 2017, Horowitz expressed criticism of the notion of cultural appropriation after a publisher had allegedly tried to dissuade him from creating a black character as a central figure in one of his novels, and supported fellow author Lionel Shriver's critiques on the same issue. He also criticised the social phenomenon of cancel culture and "mobbing" of figures for expressing diverse opinions, stating, "There is a rigidity in the way we have begun to think and speak. If we step outside certain lines on certain issues, we find not just people disagreeing, but disagreeing to the extent of death threats. When somebody says something untoward in the press, and I am not saying this about myself, people don't just say that was a stupid thing to say. They say, Lose your job. They want you to never ever have an income again."

== Honours and awards ==
Horowitz was appointed Officer of the Order of the British Empire (OBE) in the 2014 New Year Honours and Commander of the Order of the British Empire (CBE) in the 2022 New Year Honours, both for services to literature. He won an Edgar Allan Poe Award for Best Television Episode Teleplay from Episode 1 of Magpie Murders. In 2003, he won Hampshire Book Award for the book Skeleton Key, part of Alex Rider, whilst getting a nomination in 2007. He has also won Lancashire Book of the Year in 2006. For Foyle's War, there was a BAFTA Lew Grade Award in 2003 with an additional two nominations for Best Drama Series and Best Production Design won, and he was nominated for the Edgar Allan Poe Award in 2016 for the episode "Elise, The Final Mystery". In 2005, Anthony Horowitz, for Stormbreaker, received a California Young Reader Medal, Rebecca Caudill Young Reader's Book Award (2004), Utah Beehive Award (2004), Wisconsin Golden Archer Award (2003), California Young Reader Medal (2005), Iowa Teen Award (2005), South Carolina Junior Book Award (2005). He was elected a Fellow of the Royal Society of Literature in 2018. Horowitz is a patron of the Museum of Richmond.

== Bibliography ==
=== Young adult novels ===
==== Alex Rider series ====
1. Stormbreaker (2000)
2. Point Blanc (2001; US title: Point Blank)
3. Skeleton Key (2002)
4. Eagle Strike (2003)
5. Scorpia (2004)
6. Ark Angel (2005)
7. Snakehead (2007)
8. Crocodile Tears (2009)
9. Scorpia Rising (2011)
10. Russian Roulette (2013)
11. Never Say Die (2017)
12. Secret Weapon (2019)
13. Nightshade (2020)
14. Nightshade Revenge (2023)

==== Short story collections ====
1. Alex Rider: Undercover (2020)

==== Related works ====
1. Alex Rider: The Gadgets (2005)
2. Alex Rider: Mission Files (2008)

==== The Power of Five (The Gatekeepers) series ====
1. Raven's Gate (2005)
2. Evil Star (2006)
3. Nightrise (2007)
4. Necropolis (2008)
5. Oblivion (2012)

=== Children's novels ===
==== Diamond Brothers series ====
1. The Falcon's Malteser (1986)
2. Public Enemy Number Two (1987)
3. South By South East (1991)
4. The Blurred Man (2003)
5. I Know What You Did Last Wednesday (2003)
6. The French Confection (2003)
7. The Greek Who Stole Christmas (2007)
8. Where Seagulls Dare (2022)

==== Short stories ====
1. The Double Eagle Has Landed (2011; published in Guys Read: Thriller)

==== Horowitz Horror series ====
1. Horowitz Horror (1999)
2. More Horowitz Horror (2001)
3. More Bloody Horowitz (2009; retitled as Bloody Horowitz in the United States)

==== Legends series ====
1. Beasts and Monsters (2010)
2. Battles and Quests (2010)
3. Death and the Underworld (2011)
4. Heroes and Villains (2011)
5. The Wrath of the Gods (2012)
6. Tricks and Transformations (2012)

==== Groosham Grange series ====
1. Groosham Grange (1988)
2. The Unholy Grail (1999; later reissued as Return to Groosham Grange)

==== Pentagram series ====
1. The Devil's Door-Bell (1983)
2. The Night of the Scorpion (1985)
3. The Silver Citadel (1986)
4. Day of the Dragon (1989)

=== Standalone children's novels ===
1. The Sinister Secret of Frederick K. Bower (1979; reissued in 1985 as Enter Frederick K. Bower)
2. Misha, the Magician and the Mysterious Amulet (1981)
3. Granny (1994)
4. The Switch (1996)
5. The Devil and His Boy (1998)

=== Other children's novels ===
1. Robin of Sherwood: The Hooded Man (1986; with Richard Carpenter)
2. Adventurer (1987)
3. New Adventures of William Tell (1989)
4. Starting Out (1990)

=== Children's collections ===
1. Myths and Legends (1985)
2. The Kingfisher Book of Myths and Legends (2003)
3. Three of Diamonds (2004)
4. Four of Diamonds (2008)
5. The Complete Horowitz Horror (2008)
6. Midnight Feast (2011; with Meg Cabot, Eoin Colfer, Garth Nix, Louise Rennison and Darren Shan)
7. RED (2012; with Cecelia Ahern, Rachel Cusk, Emma Donoghue, Max Hastings, Victoria Hislop, Hanif Kureishi, Andrew Motion and Will Self)
8. Groosham Grange: Two Books in One! (2011)

=== Anthologies (edited) ===
1. The Puffin Book of Horror Stories (1994; reissued as Death Walks Tonight in 1995)

=== Graphic novels ===
==== The Power of Five graphic novels ====
1. The Power of Five 1: Raven's Gate (2010)
2. The Power of Five 2: Evil Star (2014)
3. The Power of Five 3: Nightrise (2014)

==== Alex Rider graphic novels ====
1. Alex Rider: Stormbreaker
2. Alex Rider: Point Blanc
3. Alex Rider: Skeleton Key
4. Alex Rider: Eagle Strike
5. Alex Rider: Scorpia
6. Alex Rider: Ark Angel

==== Edge: Horowitz Graphic Horror ====
1. The Phone Goes Dead (2010)
2. Scared (2010)
3. Killer Camera (2010)
4. The Hitchhiker (2010)

=== Adult novels ===
==== Sherlock Holmes novels ====
1. The House of Silk (2011)
2. Moriarty (2014)

===== Short stories =====
1. The Three Monarchs (2014; eBook)
2. The Adventure of the Seven Christmas Cards (2020; published in three parts in the Daily Mail, 21–23 December)

==== James Bond novels ====
1. Trigger Mortis (2015)
2. Forever and a Day (2018)
3. With a Mind to Kill (2022)

==== Susan Ryeland series ====
1. Magpie Murders (2016)
2. Moonflower Murders (2020)
3. Marble Hall Murders (2025)
4. Mile End Murders (2027)

==== Hawthorne and Horowitz series ====
1. The Word Is Murder (2017)
2. The Sentence Is Death (2019)
3. A Line to Kill (2021)
4. The Twist of a Knife (2022)
5. Close to Death (2024)
6. A Deadly Episode (2026)
7. The Vanishing Jury (2027)

=== Standalone adult novels ===
- Poisoned Pen (2002; never published in the UK but released as El asesinato de Shakespeare in Spanish and William S. in Dutch)
- The Killing Joke (2004)

=== Novellas ===
- Vermeer to Eternity (2015; Kindle single)

== Filmography ==
Film writer

- Just Ask for Diamond (1988)
- The Gathering (2003)
- Stormbreaker (2006) (Also executive producer)

TV series

Year	Title	Writer	Executive Producer	Creator	Notes
1986	Robin of Sherwood	Yes	No	No	5 episodes
1987	Boon	Yes	No	No	
1987-1988	Crossbow	Yes	No	Yes	12 episodes
1989	Dramarama	Yes	No	No	Episode "Back to Front"
1989–1991	Grim Tales	Yes	No	No	
1991–2001	Agatha Christie's Poirot	Yes	No	No	11 episodes
1995	Chiller	Yes	No	No	2 episodes
1996	Murder Most Horrid	Yes	No	No	1 episode
1997–2000	Midsomer Murders	Yes	No	Yes	6 episodes
1997	Crime Traveller	No	No	Yes	8 episodes
2001–2003	Murder in Mind	No	No	Yes	7 episodes
2002–2015	Foyle's War	Yes	Yes	Yes	25 episodes
2016	New Blood	No	No	Yes	7 episodes
2020–2024	Alex Rider	No	Yes	No	24 episodes
2022	Magpie Murders	Yes	Yes	Yes	6 episodes
2024	Moonflower Murders	Yes	Yes	Yes	6 episodes
2024	Nine Bodies in a Mexican Morgue	Yes	Yes	Yes	6 episodes
2026	Marble Hall Murders	Yes	Yes	Yes	6 episodes

Miniseries

Year	Title	Director	Writer	Executive Producer	Creator
1991	The Diamond Brothers	Yes	Yes	No	Yes
2009	Collision	No	Yes	No	Yes
2011	Injustice	No	Yes	Yes	Yes

== Theatre ==
Year	Title	Credit	Notes
1999	Mindgame	Playwright	Performed 1999, published 2000
2009	A Handbag	Playwright	Performed as part of the National Theatre Connections festival
2015	Dinner with Saddam	Playwright	
