= The Killing Joke (novel) =

Novel by Anthony Horowitz

- Author: Anthony Horowitz
- Publisher: The Orion Publishing Group
- Publication date: August 2004
- Pages: 272
- ISBN: 075285724X

The Killing Joke is a novel written by Anthony Horowitz, first published in 2004 by The Orion Publishing Group. It is a comedy thriller about a man called Guy Fletcher, who tries to track down the source of a joke.

== Plot summary ==
Guy Fletcher is an actor who overhears a joke about his mother, a famous and much-loved actress (very few people know he is her son). The next day, he wonders where the joke came from and embarks on a mission to track down its origin. In the process, he falls in love with a woman called Sally. As he is investigating, he is noticed by a mysterious group led by a man called Rupert Liddy. They attempt to stop Guy, and eventually they frame him for his neighbor's murder, at which point Guy goes into hiding.

He goes back to Sally, believing her to be the last chance he has of finding out what was going on. Sally decides to go with Guy to track down the joke. His only lead, a company called Sphinx that apparently makes vacuum cleaners, is where one of the joke's trails ended. He tries to track down Sphinx, but when he rings their number, he is left holding for an hour before being redirected.

At another attempt, he maps three of the trails he had followed and found they crossed near the coast of Suffolk. He and Sally travel there, and after investigating various towns in the area, they stop at a village called Kelford. They find everyone there almost completely humourless, and that has something to do with a small island just off the coast. At night, they steal a boat and travel there. They soon get captured and brought to speak with Rupert Liddy. He puts them in cells and reveals that Sphinx creates and distributes jokes so that people will not take things, like politics, too seriously. He explains that their identity must be kept secret. If someone found out that the jokes were created by a company, people wouldn't find them funny anymore.

Rupert then tries to find out who sent Guy and who else knows about them through the torture of tickling his foot with a feather. He then places Guy and Sally in a cell together that fills up with poisonous gas. The light bulb illuminating the room will go dark when the gas level in the room is fatal. Guy and Sally breathe in the gas and fall unconscious.

They then wake up on a small boat and knock the captain unconscious. It is revealed that the light bulb in the gas chamber malfunctioned, causing the gas to be turned off before reaching a fatal level. Maintenance had not addressed the flaw because they were short-staffed, causing Liddy to shout out the punchline of the book 'How many top-secret government technicians does it take to change a light bulb?'

The penultimate chapter of the book describes with intentional clumsiness how Guy and Sally went to France to start a new life. It's written as if being spoken by someone badly describing a joke. At the end, the narrator has realized he has ruined the joke and decides to start again. The last chapter consists of the first seven words of the book.

== Critical reception ==
Denise Pickles of Reviewing the Evidence said that while The Killing Joke was sometimes confusing, the book as a whole was interesting.
