= Dursley McLinden =

British actor (1965–1995)

- Born: Dursley James McLinden; 29 May 1965; Douglas, Isle of Man
- Died: 7 August 1995 (aged 30); London, England
- Occupation: Actor
- Years active: 1985–1995

Dursley James McLinden (29 May 1965 – 7 August 1995) was a British actor.

== Early life ==
McLinden was born on 29 May 1965 in Douglas, Isle of Man. At the age of 8, he made his first stage appearance at Willaston School, playing the dame in Dick Whittington. Aged 16, he left his home in Douglas and became the youngest student to be admitted to the Mountview Theatre School in Crouch End, where he trained as an actor.

== Career ==
McLinden's career was mostly focused on the stage. He was cast in international touring productions of The Threepenny Opera, Macbeth, and The Man Most Likely To.... He appeared in repertory in The Crucifer of Blood in Ipswich, To Kill a Mockingbird and Damn Yankees in Birmingham, and Robert and Elizabeth at the Chichester Festival Theatre. His first West End appearance was in the ensemble of the 1985 revival of Gigi at the Lyric Theatre. McLinden's West End breakthrough came in 1988, when he took over the role of Young Ben in the revival of Follies at the Shaftesbury Theatre, appearing opposite Daniel Massey and Eartha Kitt. From 1992 until his death in 1995, he was a member of the company of The Phantom of the Opera, performing in the ensemble and understudying (and sometimes performing as) Raoul.

McLinden appeared in the title role in the film Just Ask for Diamond (1988) and his television roles included playing Sgt. Mike Smith in the Doctor Who story Remembrance of the Daleks (1988).

== Illness and death ==
Falling ill in 1988, McLinden was diagnosed with HIV/AIDS in 1990. As a result, he raised money for West End Cares, the theatrical arm of AIDS charity Crusaid. Alongside his close friends Jill Nalder and Jae Alexander, McLinden frequently performed in fundraising cabaret nights at Smith's restaurant in Covent Garden. The actor continued working up until a few weeks before his death. His final performance as Raoul in Phantom came the night before his 30th birthday; he was hospitalised after the performance. His death was attributed to AIDS.

== Legacy ==
The lead character of Ritchie Tozer (Olly Alexander) in the 2021 AIDS drama It's a Sin was inspired by McLinden. It's A Sin writer Russell T Davies met McLinden through mutual friend Jill Nalder. The series also contains a direct tribute to McLinden, by way of Ritchie appearing in a fictional Doctor Who story, where he plays the character Trooper Linden.

McLinden is the subject of a 2024 documentary made for the Blu-ray box set Doctor Who: The Collection — Season 25, entitled "Looking for Dursley", which explores his life and career.

== Other appearances ==
- Mr. Bean Shoe Salesman in Mr. Bean Goes To Town 1991
- After Henry Edward in "Party Politics" 1990
- Just Ask for Diamond 1988 aka Diamond's Edge Tim Diamond
- The Diamond Brothers: South by South East Tim Diamond
- Doctor Who – Remembrance of the Daleks 1988; Sgt Mike Smith
