= Against the Dying of the Light =

2001 film about the National Screen and Sound Archive of Wales

Against the Dying of the Light is a 2001 documentary film about the work of the National Screen and Sound Archive of Wales.

== Film history ==
Consisting of interviews with Welsh directors, actors and public figures about the significance that film (particularly amateur film) has played in their lives, it achieved a limited UK cinema release in 2001.

The film was also shown at a handful of festivals and special screenings around the world, including two at the British Academy of Film and Television Arts in London. An intriguing gem, it is still occasionally to be seen at cinemas and film societies in the UK.

The film was directed by Jack Jewers, produced by Jack Jewers, Leo Brend and the (then) head of the archive, Iola Baines. It features interviews with William Lloyd-George, (grandson of David Lloyd George); the actors Rhys Ifans, Donna Edwards and Sue Rodderick; the directors Marc Evans and Karl Francis; and the author Kevin Brownlow.

Jewers described the commissioning of the film as follows:

Against the Dying of the Light was my first fully-commissioned professional film. It was a ten-minute short, for cinema release, funded by the BFI and the Arts Council. They had seen Labour of Love (the documentary I had made about a lost British feature film unearthed by the Welsh Film Archive, which subsequently won a Royal Television Society Award) and asked me to make a promotional film to go on limited release in UK cinemas. The film was to focus on the work of the same archive, but covering a much broader subject base – basically examining the whole argument for sustaining film archives and the value they bring to society as a whole.

Jewers recorded that he was struck by "the sheer power and historical value" of the Welsh Film Archive, and "astonished to discover" 8mm film of Hitler meeting David Lloyd George.

Jewers described his approach to the film as:

The number one rule, as far as I was concerned, was that this should be treated as a film first, documentary second. This was being made for a filmgoing audience, after all, and a sophisticated one at that. There would be no 'third person' voice over, and certainly no presenter. Where the films were powerful enough to speak for themselves, they should be allowed to do so; when they needed context, this would take the form interviews with people who were personally connected to the material itself, be it emotionally or otherwise.

== Title ==
The title of the film comes from a villanelle written for his dying father by the twentieth century Welsh poet Dylan Thomas, Do Not Go Gentle into That Good Night.
