= Maurice Born =

Swiss architect, ethnographer, and writer (1943–2020)

- Born: 31 December 1943; Saint-Imier, Switzerland
- Died: 9 July 2020 (aged 76); Auch, France
- Education: École Polytechnique Fédérale de Lausanne; Leibniz University Hannover
- Known for: Study of the leper colony of Spinalonga in Greece

Maurice Born (31 December 1943 – 9 July 2020) was a Swiss architect, ethnographer, sociologist and writer, known for his work on the study of the leper colony of Spinalonga in Greece.

== Background ==
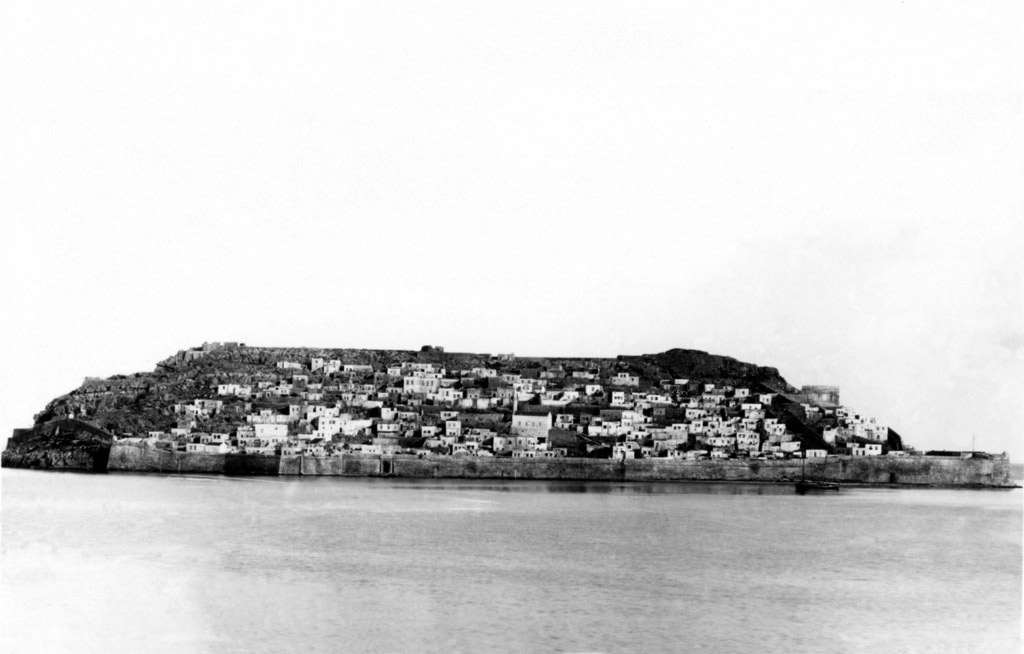
Spinalonga in 1901

Spinalonga is a small barren island located in the Gulf of Elounda in north-eastern Crete. In 1564, when it was part of the Kingdom of Candia, the Venetians built a fortress on Spinalonga, which soon became a key outpost for controlling the trading routes to the Levant. After Crete fell to the Ottoman Turks in 1649, Spinalonga remained under Venetian control until 1718. Shortly after the departure of the last Ottomans in 1898, the Cretan State established a leper colony on the island in 1904 that operated until 1957. This decision was influenced both by political factors and Edvard Ehlers' theories, who was strongly in favor of secluding leprosy patients in order to contain the disease. Spinalonga initially received patients from Crete but after 1913, when Crete was annexed to the Kingdom of Greece, also from mainland Greece.

== Early life ==
Maurice Born was born in Saint-Imier near Bienne in the canton of Bern. He studied architecture at the EPFL in Lausanne and at the LUH in Hannover.

== Work on Spinalonga ==
Interested in social isolation and social stigma, Born heard about Spinalonga from a friend and first visited the island in 1967. At that time, Spinalonga had been abandoned for ten years but little was known about the life of patients on the island; neither the state nor the locals wished to share details about the colony. Born was intrigued by the islands' past and returned in 1968, supported by a grant from the Paris Institute of the Environment (French: Institut de l’Environnement).

Based at the nearby fishing village of Plaka, he meticulously surveyed the settlement, the bastions and the fortifications on the island. At the same time, he gained the confidence of residents of Plaka and nearby villages who had been in regular contact with Spinalonga inmates and collected their accounts on life on the island. Born then turned his attention to former Spinalonga confinees who had been transferred to the Hospital of Infectious Diseases in Agia Varvara, Attica and recorded their stories. It was there where he met and befriended with Epaminondas Remoundakis (el), the most emblematic inmate of Spinalonga, whom he interviewed for long periods of time.

Funded by Sandoz Laboratories, Born and director Jean-Daniel Pollet produced in 1973 the documentary L'Ordre that focuses on Spinalonga and includes a unique interview with Remoundakis. In 2015, he published a book titled Vies et morts d’un Crétois lépreux (Lifes and deaths of a Cretan leper) that is based on Remoundakis' narrations.

== Later life ==
During the 1980s in Saint-Imier, Born founded Espace noir, an anarchist cultural cooperative, and the Canevas editions.

Born also developed an interest in contemporary history of Crete. He became a member of the Society of Cretan Historical Studies (Greek: Εταιρεία Κρητικών Ιστορικών Μελετών (ΕΚΙΜ)). During the last decade of his life, Born had settled in Neapoli. In October 2019, he was declared an honorary citizen of Agios Nikolaos. He died in Auch, France after a long illness.
