= To Nisi =

- Το Νησί
- Genre: Drama, mystery
- Written by: Victoria Hislop; Mirella Papaeconomou
- Directed by: Theodoris Papadoulakis
- Ending theme: "Ise Esi O Anthropos Mou" by Andriana Babali, "Mavri Petalouda" by Yannis Haroulis
- Composer: Minos Matsas
- Country of origin: Greece
- Original language: Greek
- No. of seasons: 1
- No. of episodes: 26

Production
- Producer: Nino Elmatzioglou
- Production locations: Crete, Greece
- Cinematography: Vaggelis Katrizidakis
- Production companies: TVE S.A., Indigo View

Original release
- Network: Mega Channel
- Release: 11 October 2010 – 23 May 2011

To Nisi (Greek: Το Νησί; English: The Island) is a Greek television series based on the best-selling English novel The Island by Victoria Hislop, airing on Mega Channel. The series premiered on 11 October 2010 to record ratings and critical acclaim. It was the most expensive Greek television production ever with a budget of €4 million.

== Production ==
=== Conception ===
The series was one of the most expensive television shows in Greek television history with a budget of €4 million. The Island author Victoria Hislop had previously received offers from Hollywood as high as £300,000 for the movie rights to the novel, although she opted instead to grant the rights to Mega Channel for a lower fee in return for some artistic control.

Mega Channel initially intended to make a film of the novel, but they finally decided upon a 26 episode television series. Mirella Papaeconomou primarily adapted the script, and with Hislop's permission added stories and characters that do not exist in the novel to extend the story to a full season. Hislop actively participated in the entire process with ideas, suggestions, and observations. Thodoris Papadoulakis directed the series.

=== Filming ===
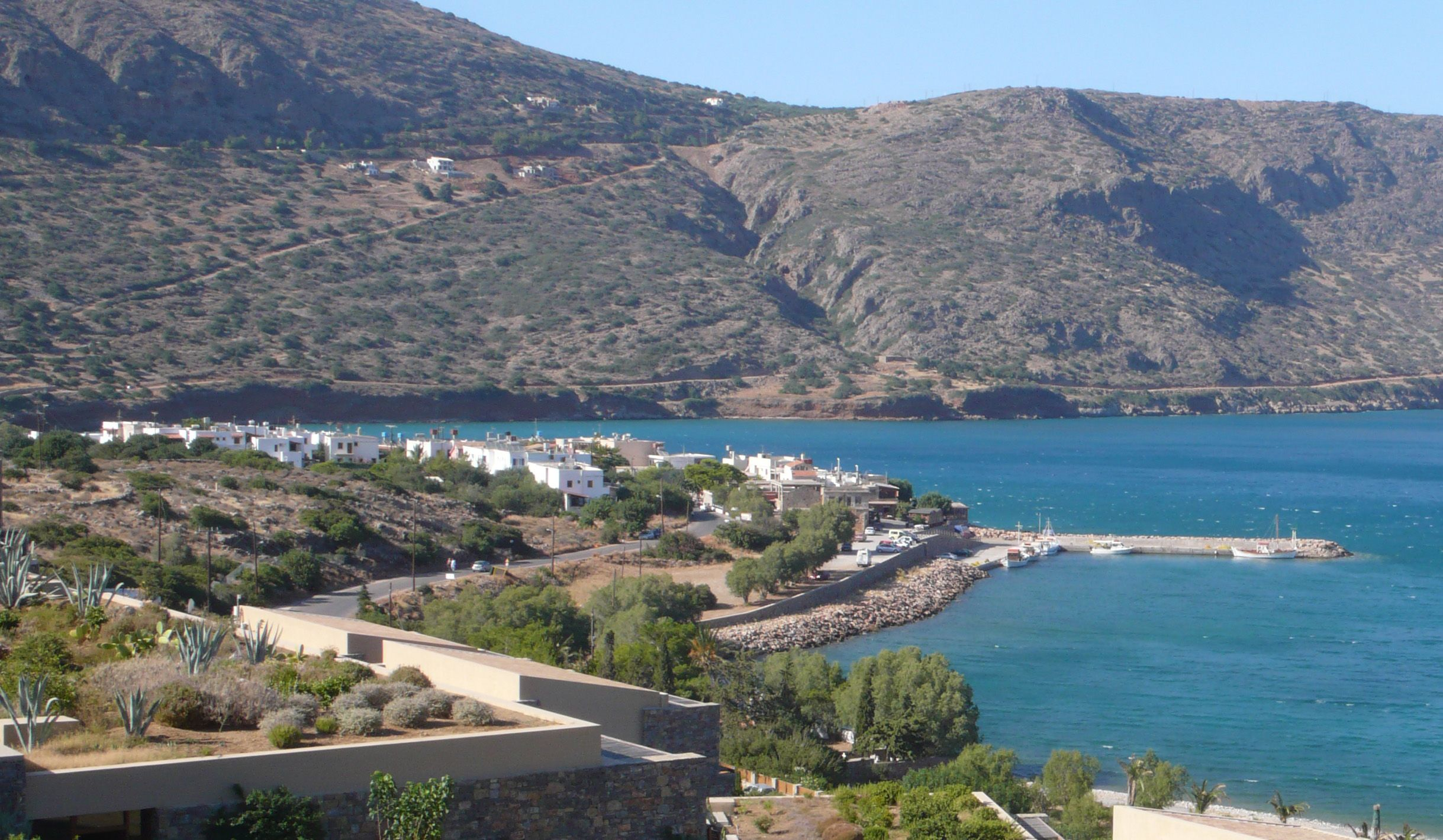
Some scenes were filmed in the port of Plaka.

The cinematographer was Vaggelis Katrizidakis, Cretan director Thodoris Papadoulakis convinced Mega Channel to film the entire series on location in Crete, arguing that Spinalonga recreates a natural setting. Filming began in December 2009 and concluded in December 2010, primarily taking place in Plaka, Spinalonga, upper Elounda, and Agios Nikolaos.

Sets portraying the villages from 1939 to 1957 were designed by stage director Antonis Halkias and his colleagues. For authenticity purposes, as many scenes as possible were shot on location in Plaka and Spinalonga, including scenes of the port where the boat from the small fishing village of Plaka arrives, as well as the market streets. Shooting for many of the segments in Old Plaka took place in constructed sets resembling the old village in upper Elounda.

=== Costuming and music ===
- Xanthi Kontou and Maria Kontodima undertook the costuming for the series. In order to gain an accurate portrayal of the period between 1939 and 1957, Kontou and Kontodima researched the styles for eight months resulting in about 2,000 unique costumes.
- The theme song for the series Ise Esi O Anthropos Mou performed by Andriana Babali is a cover by Minos Matsas of a 1950 song (S.Peristeris-M.Margaritis), originally performed by Sotiria Bellou. This was released prior to the series, in Andriana Babali's The Rose Tattoo album (Minos EMI ©2009).
- The principal composer of the series musical score is Minos Matsas. The official album Soundtrack was released on 4 December 2010 by Minos EMI and contain songs performed by Dimitris Mitropanos, Andriana Babali, Eleonora Zouganeli and Giannis Haroulis.

== Synopsis ==
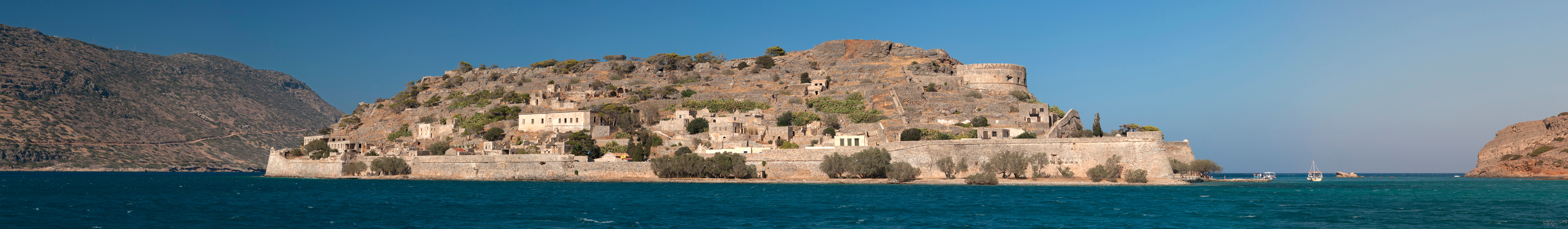
Much of the series takes place in the old leper colony on the island of Spinalonga in Crete.

Based on the novel The Island by Victoria Hislop, the series takes place on the island of Spinalonga, off the coast of Crete, and in the village of Plaka which lies within swimming distance across from it. To Nisi tells the story of Alexis Fielding, a woman on the cusp of a life-changing decision. Alexis knows little about her family's past and has always resented her mother's refusal to discuss it. She knows only that her mother, Sofia, grew up in Plaka, a small Cretan village, before moving to London. Making her first visit to Crete to see the village where her mother was born, Alexis discovers that the village of Plaka faces the small, now deserted island of Spinalonga, which she is surprised to learn was Greece's leper colony for much of the early 20th century. At Plaka, Alexis meets an old friend of her mother's, Fotini, who is prepared to tell her the entire tragic story of her family that Sofia has spent her life concealing—the story of Eleni, her grandmother, and of a family torn apart by war and passion. Alexis discovers how intimately she is connected with the island, along with the horror and pity of the leper colony which was once there.

== Cast and characters ==
There are more than 120 roles in the series, with more than 500 supporting actors.

=== Main characters ===
- Stelios Mainas as Giorgos Petrakis, a fisherman who lives in Plaka with his wife Eleni and two daughters Maria and Anna.
- Katerina Lehou as Eleni Petraki, Giorgos' wife and the schoolteacher of Plaka.
- Aimilios Heilakis as Manolis Vandoulakis, Alexandos Vandoulakis's nephew
- Alexandros Logothetis as Nikos Kiritsis, a doctor at the hospital in Heraklion and Dr. Lapakis's friend.
- Gioulika Skafida (adult), Anastasia Tsilimpiou (child), as Maria Petraki, Giorgos and Eleni's daughter and Anna's sister.
- Evgenia Dimitropoulou (adult) and Ifigeneia Tzola (child) as Anna Petraki, Giorgos and Eleni's youngest daughter and Maria's sister
- Evgenia Dimitropoulou as Alexis Fielding, Sofia's daughter and Eleni's great granddaughter.
- Giannis Stankoglou as Andreas Vandoulakis, Alexandros Vandoulakis's son, a rich land owner.
- Filareti Kominou (adult), Nefeli Kouri (teenager) and Despina Kiapekou (child) as Sofia Fielding, Anna's daughter and Alexis's mother.
- Olga Damani (old), Annita Kouli (teenager) and Rene Tzola (child) as Foteini Angelopoulou, Maria's best friend.
- Dina Michailidi as Savina Angelopoulou, Pavlos's wife and mother of Foteini and Antonis.
- Grigoris Orfanoudakis as Pavlos Angelopoulos, Savina's husband and father of Foteini and Antonis.
- Theodoros Katsafados as Petros Kontomaris, the elected head of Spinalonga.
- Marinella Vlachaki as Elpida Kontomari, Petros Kontomaris's wife.
- Nektarios Loukianos (adult) and Manos Tsangarakis (child) as Dimitris Lemonias, one of the brightest students in Eleni's classroom.
- Katerina Misichroni (adult) and Kallisti Bertacha (child) as Elektra Vlahaki, Dimitiris's companion during childhood games and later becomes his companion in life.
- Nikos Orfanos as Christos Lapakis, the doctor in Spinalonga.
- Tasos Nousias as Nikos Papadimitriou, a lawyer who is transported to Spinalonga along with other lepers from Athens.
- Maria Protopappa as Evgenia Kapetanaki, Eleni's friend and Plaka's baker.
- Orfeas Avgoustidis (adult) and Antipas Ntamotsidis (child) as Antonis Angelopoulos, Savina's and Pavlos' son.
- Ian Hislop as Marcus Fielding, Sofia's British husband

== Episodes ==
| No. | Title | Original release date | Greece viewers (millions) |
|---|---|---|---|
| 1 | "Episode 1" | 11 October 2010 | 3.88 (34.9%) |
The story starts off in 2010 London, with young Alexis starting her journey from London to Crete. She seeks to learn about her roots, which her mother Sofia has been reluctant to share. Armed with a photograph that her mother had hidden for years, she reaches the tourist village of Plaka, which lies across from the island of Spinalonga. There she meets old Foteini who undertakes the task of driving her to the past and revealing the story of her roots. Meanwhile in 1939, Eleni, Giorgos, and their two daughters live in the poor fishing village of Plaka which lies in the shadows of Spinalonga and the leper colony it houses. Giorgos transports exiled lepers to their final residency on the island. Despite living in the shadow of death, life in Plaka rolls along calmly, at least until one day. Eleni finds a skin lesion and travels to the hospital in Heraklion where she is diagnosed with leprosy. The doctor also orders all the children in her class to be examined, where they find young Dimitris sick, hiding the leprosy with long clothes. The doctor orders both of them to be transported to Spinalonga.
| 2 | "Episode 2" | 18 October 2010 | 4.02 (36.2%) |
Eleni and young Dimitris reach the island, where they are condemned to live out their lives. Their exile to the island as well as being away from their families becomes unbearable. To make matters worse, the island suffers from lack of water, something that makes the everyday lives of the lepers even more difficult. Just an association with their illness isolates Giorgos from his fellow villagers, and forces Dimitri's family to abandon their house and move away. Even though Giorgos is one of the few allowed to visit the island to transport goods, he does not find the strength/courage to meet with Eleni for days after.
| 3 | "Episode 3" | 1 November 2010 | 3.15 (28.4%) |
Giorgos tries to fall into the routine of primarily caring for his daughters, but meets difficulties with Anna's wayward/rebellious character. On Spinalonga, Dimitris makes new friends; The malice schoolteacher of the island, Ms. Kroustalaki, abuses the children, pushing Eleni to decide to teach Dimitri at her own house, with other students also joining later. This causes a clash with the school teacher of the island, who thinks she is after her job and vows to destroy her. Meanwhile, three dangerous long-term convicts are sent by the government to the island in order to patrol the lepers, and Giorgos tells Eleni to be careful so that the convicts will not harm her. At the same time, the water reservoirs on Spinalonga dry up, so Giorgos transports drinking water from Plaka for the lepers to meet basic medical needs. The citizens are also concerned of further new arrivals to the island.
| 4 | "Episode 4" | 8 November 2010 | 3.11 (28%) |
The island receives newcomers from Athens. Their arrival however, is met with resistance from certain residents. Pestered and tortured, the newcomers find help in Eleni, Dr. Lapakis, and president Kontomari amongst others. The shortage of water and the fear of what is to come agitates and scares everyone making matters worse. Across in Plaka, Giorgos forbids Maria from going with him to visit her mother as it is forbidden. Despite this, she hatches a plan to hide on her fathers boat just to get a glimpse of her mother. Meanwhile, the baker Evgenia finds a skin lesson on her neck that will forever change her life. On the island, the newcomers begin to use their knowledge and skills to help better serve the community after recovering from their long journey. But this does not change the opinions of certain residents about them, who are ready to get violent on the island. Just as a big fight is about to erupt, it finally starts to rain much to the joy of everyone on the island.
| 5 | "Episode 5" | 15 November 2010 | 3.24 (29.2%) |
Evgenia's health becomes worse day by day, and she is haunted by the fear that she may make her children sick as well. She finds refuge at the monastery, where the clergyman convinces her to leave for Spinalonga. On Spinalonga, optimism for a better life is fueled by Nikos Papadimitriou. Elections are held with the active Papadimitriou winning and becoming the new head of the island, but not without a fight from an opposing figure; Kroustalaki receives complaints from parents over her abuse to the children. Anna falls ill with mysterious skin lesions on her body, forcing Giorgos to notify Dr. Lapaki fearing the worst.
| 6 | "Episode 6" | 22 November 2010 | 3.01 (29.5%) |
War breaks out in Europe; Eleni is named the new schoolteacher by the new head of Spinalonga, angering Ms. Kroustalaki. Dr. Kiritsis visits Spinalonga, bringing hope of a new medicine but also revealing that research for it is still in the initial stage. Maria meets him by the seawall in Plaka, and asks him to make her mother better. However, Eleni's health worsens as time progresses; At their house, Evgenia attends to her and Eleni asks her to look after Dimitri if something happens to her. Island resident Nikos Dimitrakis secretly swims across to Plaka to see his wife and his son; His wife begs him to take them with him to Spinalonga. Swimming back to Spinalonga late at night, the guard is looking right toward Nikos direction but is distracted by Dimitri, who throws a rock at him; Dr. Kiritsis is called off to war.
| 7 | "Episode 7" | 29 November 2010 | 3.28 (30.3%) |
German troops invade Crete and bomb Heraklion. The residents of Plaka feel the ferocity of the intruders first hand, as they occupy the village and enter their homes and seizing their supplies. In an act of heroism, Giorgos saves Manolio from getting shot by the Germans. Antonis joins the Cretan resistance and leaves with his cousin Damiano and three Englishmen for the mountains. On Spinalonga, Papadimitriou has thought ahead and stockpiled food and other supplies for the residents. Nikos, defying the dangers, swims across to Plaka once again in the middle of the night to meet his family. Upon his return, he is spotted by the Germans and shot dead. The illness takes a toll on Eleni and she collapses forcing her to be transported to the hospital. She later dies with Evgenia and Elpida by her side.
| 8 | "Episode 8" | 6 December 2010 | 2.79 (25.1%) |
The story flash forwards seven years later when the war has just ended. Antonis returns home to Plaka from the guerrilla warfare, and at the urging of his parents and Anna, he gets a job working in the fields of the rich Vandoulakis family. During the celebration of Saints Constantine and Helen, Anna continues flirting with Antonis, leading up to a kiss. However, when rich land owner Andreas Vandoulakis shows up to the celebration, Anna quickly turns her sights towards him. On Spinalonga, a grown Dimitris has become the new school teacher; Papadimitriou shows an interest in Evgenia, but she ignores his advances. Her husband Vasilis back on Plaka, hides the letters she writes to her children. Just a few days until Grigoris, one of the guards, is set to finish his sentence and leave the island, he discovers he has lepercy. Meanwhile, Kalliopi gives birth to a baby girl, and Dr. Lampakis prohibits her from nursing. However, her baby cries non-stop and does not take to other milk, forcing Kalliopi to give in.
| 9 | "Episode 9" | 13 December 2010 | 3.08 (27.7%) |
Andreas Vandoulakis sends a letter with Antonis to Anna, inviting her to his home; Despite being very jealous, Antonis gives Anna the letter. George and Anna then begin visiting the Vandoulaki compound often, and Anna becomes dazzled by the wealth; Antoni accuses her of selling herself out to the rich. Meanwhile, Alexandros Vandoulakis, Andrea's father, disagrees with his son's plans to marry the daughter of a fisherman. On Spinalonga, Dr. Kiritsis returns, bringing with him a new experimental medication that gives hope to the inhabitants of the island. Kalliopi and her husband admit to Dr. Lapaki that Kalliopi nursed her baby, and beg for him not to put the healthy baby up for adoption; Evgenia is attacked and raped returning home on a late night.
| 10 | "Episode 10" | 24 January 2011 | 2.80 (25.2%) |
Anna learns from Antoni that Alexandros Vandoulakis illness was just an excuse to get out of dinner. Meanwhile, Andreas continues clashing with his father over his intentions for Anna, and eventually asks Anna for her hand in marriage, despite his father's disapproval. On Spinalonga, Dr. Kiritsis begins administering the experimental medication to the first team of volunteer patients. Now blind, Kontomaris realizes that his end is near, and gives Papadimitriou some of his possessions. Meanwhile, Kalliopi has doubts over her decision to keep her baby on the island despite it being healthy. After being raped, Evgenia hides and becomes secluded; Papadimitriou senses that something happened, and eventually finds out the guard Grigoris did it, with the two getting into a fight by the sea. Replacement parts arrive for repairs to the electric generator, finally illuminating the island.
| 11 | "Episode 11" | 31 January 2011 | 2.96 (26.7%) |
Anna marries Andreas and her life changes in the blink of an eye; Maria and Giorgos visit Anna at the Vandoulakis villa in Neapoli, where Alexandros makes Giorgos a proposal to go into business together. Giorgos however declines the offer, refusing to abandon his little fishing boat and the life he has become accustomed to. On Spinalonga, police officers arrive to conduct an investigation into the drowning death of Grigori, but the residents of the island standby Papadimitriou. Meanwhile, day by day Papadimitriou and Evgenia grow closer; Evgenia's daughter Athinoula is uneasy with the fact that she has not received contact from her mother, and asks Giorgos if she is well. Secretly from her father, she gives Giorgos a letter to deliver to her mother secretly. Also, Dr. Kiritsis ups the dosage of the experimental medicine to the volunteers, which produce unpleasant side effects.
| 12 | "Episode 12" | 7 February 2011 | 2.93 (26.4%) |
Evegnia and Papadimitriou grow closer, and he gives Evgenia her daughter's letter; Ilektra's visions worsens almost to the point she can not see anymore. Also, the side effects of the medicine have begun to worry Papadimitriou and Dr. Lapaki, but Dr. Kiritsis remains unfazed and asks that they increase the dosage. Meanwhile in Plaka, Pavlos intercepts his daughter Fotini picking up a love letter from Stefanos, and realizes that they have been seeing each other. He prohibits her to see him again, though Stefanos asks for her hand in marriage. Also Dr. Kiritsis makes a house call for Evgenia's children in Plaka, and determines they have contracted leprosy and should be sent to Spinalonga immediately. Evgenia is heartbroken to hear the news.
| 13 | "Episode 13" | 14 February 2011 | 2.63 (23.7%) |
Evgenia's children arrive on Spinalonga, and their depressed father commits suicide; Ilektra realizes she is slowly losing her sight; Dr. Kiritsis asks to increase volunteers, to which Papadimitriou argues against after witnessing painful consequences. Dr. Kiritsis examines Dimitri, and discovers that he was misdiagnosed with leprosy and actually suffers from psoriasis; Dimitri asks the doctors not to tell anyone. Meanwhile in Neapoli, Andrea's cousin Manolis Vandoulakis makes a surprise visit and charms Anna from the first moment. In Plaka, Stefanos works nonstop in Palvo's taverna seeking to gain approval to wed Fotini. Back on Spinalonga, Papadimitriou is informed of Vasili's suicide, and undertakes the duty of telling Evgenia; Upon hearing the news, Evgenia becomes an emotional wreck and falls into his embrace. Her children witness them holding each other and run away.
| 14 | "Episode 14" | 21 February 2011 | 2.81 (25.3%) |
Full of guilt, Evgenia searches for her children, but Kroustalki finds them first and scares with bad stories about Papadimitriou; The children return home, but Lefteris refuses to talk to his mother and writes letters to his father. Evgenia asks Papadimitriou to end their relationship. Meanwhile Dr. Lapakis feels guilty about misdiagnosing Dimitris, and tries to convince him to leave the island. He however refuses to leave Ilektra, and asks her to marry him. In the meantime, vaccinations of the experimental drug begin on the second batch of volunteers. Also Stavro and Kallipoi's newborn gets sick, forcing them to take it to the hospital, where they run into Dr. Kiritsis who does not know the truth about the newborn. Back on Plaka, Stefanos continues working hard at Pavlo's taverna, and in Neapoli, Manolis tries hard to charm everyone.
| 15 | "Episode 15" | 28 February 2011 | 2.89 (26%) |
Dr. Kiritsis discovers that Kalliopi's baby is actually healthy, but decides to keep it on the island to perform scientific research instead of sending it for adoption. Dr Kiritsis also begins mixing medicines in an effort to find a cure, which result in deaths with Papdimitriou demanding he stop immediately, threatening to send a letter to the government. Meanwhile, Dimitris tries to get through to Lefteris who remains isolated, and becomes even more so when he learns of his father's death. In Neapoli, Alexandros gives Manolis some responsibilities and powers, and he charms and is charmed by Anna more and more each day; Antonis sees Manolis going in and out of the house when Andreas is absent, and suspects something is going on between Manolis and Anna. Anna invites her father and Maria to the house for his name day, where Manolis becomes impressed by Maria. Anna realizes this, and becomes incredibly jealous.
| 16 | "Episode 16" | 7 March 2011 | 2.82 (25.4%) |
Manolis and Antonis plan a gathering in Plaka; Foteini picks up on Manoli's attraction to Maria, but Maria appears unfazed. Manolis speaks of Maria with enthusiasm, and Anna tries to hide her jealousy toward her sister. Meanwhile on Spinalonga, Lefteris continues to hold his mother responsible for his father's death, and Papadimitriou confronts Dr. Kiritsis about the side effects of the drug trials and warns him to stop once again. Volunteers continue to dwindle as the side effects turn deadly, until a letter finally comes from the government ordering Dr. Kiritsis to leave the island and stop the experimental drug trials. Also Stavros and Kalliopi are found at an impasse and escape from the island with their daughter and with Dimitri's help.
| 17 | "Episode 17" | 14 March 2011 | 2.78 (25%) |
Papadimitriou raises black flags on the walls and gates of the island, declaring a hunger strike and commercial embargo between the island and the mainland in an attempt to pressure the government into reinstating cut benefits; the plan is met with resistance from his opponents and residents who suffer the consequences. The residents of Plaka are also found in a very difficult situation since most of the town live off of the commercial trade with Spinalonga. The government sends representatives to the island in an attempt to convince them to stop the embargo, but Papadimitriou will not budge and the government decides to reinstate their benefits bringing an end to the strike and embargo. Meanwhile Evgenia becomes heavily ill and in desperation Lefteris asks Papadimitriou for help. Also Dimitris reveals to Ilektra that he is not sick with Leprosy but still wants to remain on the island, and she tries to commit suicide thinking she is the reason keeping him from leaving the island. Back on Plaka Manolis continues to visit often, showing his interest in Maria, until he finally asks her father for her hand in marriage.
| 18 | "Episode 18" | 21 March 2011 | 2.99 (26.9%) |
Papadimitriou approaches Evegnia's children and asks Lefteris to work at the island's newspaper; Evgenia becomes happy seeing her children begin to like him. Meanwhile Manolis announces to his family that he has proposed to Maria, and Anna hides her jealously pretending to be happy for her sister. Giorgos is ecstatic at his daughter's good luck, and Manolis and Maria have an engagement celebration in Plaka. Anna does not attend the celebration due to her jealousy, instead pretending to be sick. Later Anna visits Plaka for the first time in a long time where Maria is preparing for her wedding and marriage, but Maria discovers marks on her leg that resemble those of her mother's; Anna sees them as well.
| 19 | "Episode 19" | 28 March 2011 | 3.15 (28.4%) |
Lefteris begins to like Papadimitriou and understands that his mother loves him and wants them to live together. He tells his mother he wouldn't mind living at Papadimitriou's house, and the family moves to his house. Meanwhile Giorgos and Maria visit Dr. Kiritsis in Heraklion for examinations, where Dr. Kiritsis diagnoses Maria with leprosy and informs her she must be sent to Spinalonga. A crushed Giorgos tells Manoli the news, and Anna reveals to the Vandoulakis family that her mother also suffered from leprosy like her sister, and that she had lied to them about her cause of death being from a heart attack. Alexandros reacts with rage to the news, and orders Anna to leave his house immediately although Andreas and his mother do not approve. He also turns away Giorgos, shouting slurs at him and telling him that they fooled and embarrassed his family. Alexandros orders Andreas to get a doctor to examine Anna. Also Manolis bids farewell to Maria, telling her that whatever they had is over; Maria leaves Plaka for Spinalonga.
| 20 | "Episode 20" | 4 April 2011 | 3.04 (27.4%) |
Maria arrives in Spinalonga and settles into the house where her mother lived and died. On the island she meets her mother's old friend Elpida, which she knew about through her mother's letters to her as a child, as well as Dimitri which Eleni raised like her own child, and her enemy Kroustalaki who says bad things about her mother to her. In Plaka, Savina tries to comfort Giorgos, and he continues to visits his daughter at the port on Spinalonga like he used to meet his wife. In Neapoli, Anna has locked herself in her room all day, and the Vandoulakis family brings a doctor to examine her for leprosy. Meanwhile Manolis has been missing for days. Also Dr. Kiritsis makes a sudden return to Spinalonga, arriving with good news from America on the progress of research for a treatment. Despite the good news, Papadimitriou demands he leave immediately. Meanwhile Maria falls into a routine on the island, being offered a role in a theater production despite her initial refusal. Later the daughter of a mayor from a different nearby village is diagnosed with leprosy, and a mob headed by the enraged mayor from the village forms in Plaka with intentions to cross over to Spinalonga and burn the island down.
| 21 | "Episode 21" | 11 April 2011 | 2.93 (26,4%) |
Dr. Kiritsis manages to stop the mob threatened to burn the island. The people of Spinalonga welcome him as a savior. However, his efforts to convince the people and the president Papadimitriou for providing the new drugs meet their incredulity given the previous failure of the promin drug. Meanwhile, Dr. Kyritsis begins visits to Maria's house. Manolis returns to Neapoli to convince Anna to apologize to her father in law. Andreas asks Manolis to go with his wife in Plaka to see her father. On the way they detour.
| 22 | "Episode 22" | 18 April 2011 | 3.02 (27,2%) |
Giorgos visits for the first time the interior of the island and the home of his daughter, Maria. The same house where his wife Eleni lived and died. Elpida, which participates in the new experimental treatment, dies. Dr. Kiritsis tries to convince Papadimitriou and the sorority members to volunteer in the new drug to set an example to the others. The results of the new drug seem promising. Maria asks to volunteer. Kroustalaki sees Dr. Kyritsis visiting Maria's house and pours poison for another time. In Neapoli, Antonis understands the love affair of Anna and Manolis. Anna announces to the Vandoulakis family that she is pregnant.
| 23 | "Episode 23" | 2 May 2011 | 3.13 (28,2%) |
The time passes and in Neapoli, Anna baptize her daughter with Manolis being the godfather. Manolis avoids Anna which shows more passionate than ever. Alexandros Vandoulakis proposes to his nephew to inherit a large part of their family estate in Messara and to leave Neapoli to attend the estate. Anna feels trapped. Alexis realizes for the first time that her mother, Sophia, is the daughter of Anna. She asks the elder Fotini, if the father of her mother and grandfather is Andreas or Manolis. The relationship between Maria and Dr. Kiritsis becomes more familiar but both have reasons to hesitate and fear to make dreams for the future. At Spinalonga the first four patients are cured.
| 24 | "Episode 24" | 9 May 2011 | 3.41 (30,7%) |
Manolis is leaving to take over the estates of his uncle in Messara. Anna loses all hope but rejoices when her husband tells her to go together to visit him. Eventually, Andreas goes by himself and finds his cousin. Anna can not contain her frustration in front of her in-laws and argues with her husband when he returns from Manolis. In Spinalonga many people are hesitant to leave because they do not know how to greet the outside world after so many years. They decide to leave the island all together on 25 August. The people of Plaka prepare for them a great feast. Anna and Andreas are preparing to go to Plaka to greet Maria.
| 25 | "Episode 25" | 16 May 2011 | 3.58 (32,2%) |
The people of Spinalonga arrive at Plaka. The people of Plaka welcome them with emotion and joy. The disease was defeated! The fights and struggles of doctors and patients are rewarded... The party goes on. The marriage proposal to Maria from Dr. Kyritsis makes the happiness of both greater. Anna and her husband, reaching Plaka, squabble. The last act of a drama will take place there, where perpetrator and victim blinded by their passion will close every door to logic and set their fates and that of their families. Anna murdered. Andreas imprisoned. The Vandoulaki family dissolves... Maria, once again, aside her own desires to be with her father, who is so tortured... The love of Dr. Kyritsis, however, is very strong and persistent... Maybe they both have the opportunity to pursuit happiness together...
| 26 | "Episode 26" | 23 May 2011 | 3.83 (34,5%) |
Past and present meet to write the finale to the stories of our heroes... The daughter of Anna, Sophia, growing up faces the burden of her family tragedy and decides to leave and build her life away from Crete. The storytelling of the elderly Fotini will end and Alexis, the daughter of Sophia, now fully aware of her identity, will have to take her decisions and to continue her life. In the shadow of Spinalonga, truths will be told, purification will be achieved and the old with the new generation, together, will look at the future with clarity...

== International syndication ==
| Country | TV network(s) | Notes |
|---|---|---|
| Albania | AS TV | Premiered on 12 December 2012 |
| Bosnia and Herzegovina | TV1 | Premiered on 15 October 2011 |
| Croatia | RTL Televizija | Premiered on 1 January 2012 |
| Cyprus | Mega Channel Cyprus | Premiered on 11 October 2010 |
| Serbia | RTV Pink | Premiered on 27 February 2012 |
| Turkey | ATV | Premiered in December 2011 |
| Hungary | Duna TV | Premiere on 6 July 2014 |
| Romania | | |
| Finland | YLE Teema | Premiered on 10 December 2013 |
| United Kingdom | | |

== Impact and reception ==
=== Ratings ===
Upon its premiere, To Nisi set record ratings for a series with an estimated 3.88 million total viewers tuning in, or 34.9% of the viewing population in Greece. The share rating amounted to 61.7%, meaning approximately six out of every ten viewers watching television at the time were tuned into To Nisi, while also receiving 72.8% share rating in the coveted 15–44 age group. The premiere beat the previous total viewers record of 34.6% set in 1998 by Mega Channel's series Psithiroi Kardias. Upon the airing of the second episode, To Nisi beat its own record, receiving an estimated 4.02 million total viewers, or 36.2%.

=== Critical reception ===
Critical reception of the television series was highly positive. During a pre-screening for the press at Athens Concert Hall, the show received critical acclaim. The series was also reportedly being eyed by foreign networks.

Popi Diamantakou of Ta Nea stated that the work of the director and the actors exceeded expectations. Marianna Tziantzi of Kathimerini asserted that the astronomical ratings received for the first episode prove that the series will be the television phenomenon of the year; a title well deserved as it is artistically ambitious during a period of subpar television productions on air. She added that the book- and the television series as an extension- provide an unintentional allegory of our time; speaking of love in a time of crisis and social exclusion. Also commenting on its record viewership and differentiation qualities, Marina Petroutsou of Eleftherotypia pointed out that the public eagerly awaited a quality production, as the networks have been using the euro area crisis as an excuse for low quality programs. She also noted that the day after the premiere, many daytime shows covered the series, leading her to believe that it was seen as a means to boost their own ratings. Afroditi Grammeli of To Vima observed that from the first minutes of the series on air, a flow of commentary praising the series broke out across the internet, notably through the creation of three social networking groups on Facebook that accepted thousands of members within the time frame of the premiere. Praise was given for its touching and atmospheric shots, solid acting, exceptional direction, and stunning stage design. Contrastingly, Grammeli also regarded that the mass praise did not come without negative criticism by a minority, who found the series depressing, slow, old fashioned, and overly dramatic.
