= Spinalonga =

Island northeast of Crete

Spinalonga (Kalydon)
Native name: Σπιναλόγκα (Καλυδών)
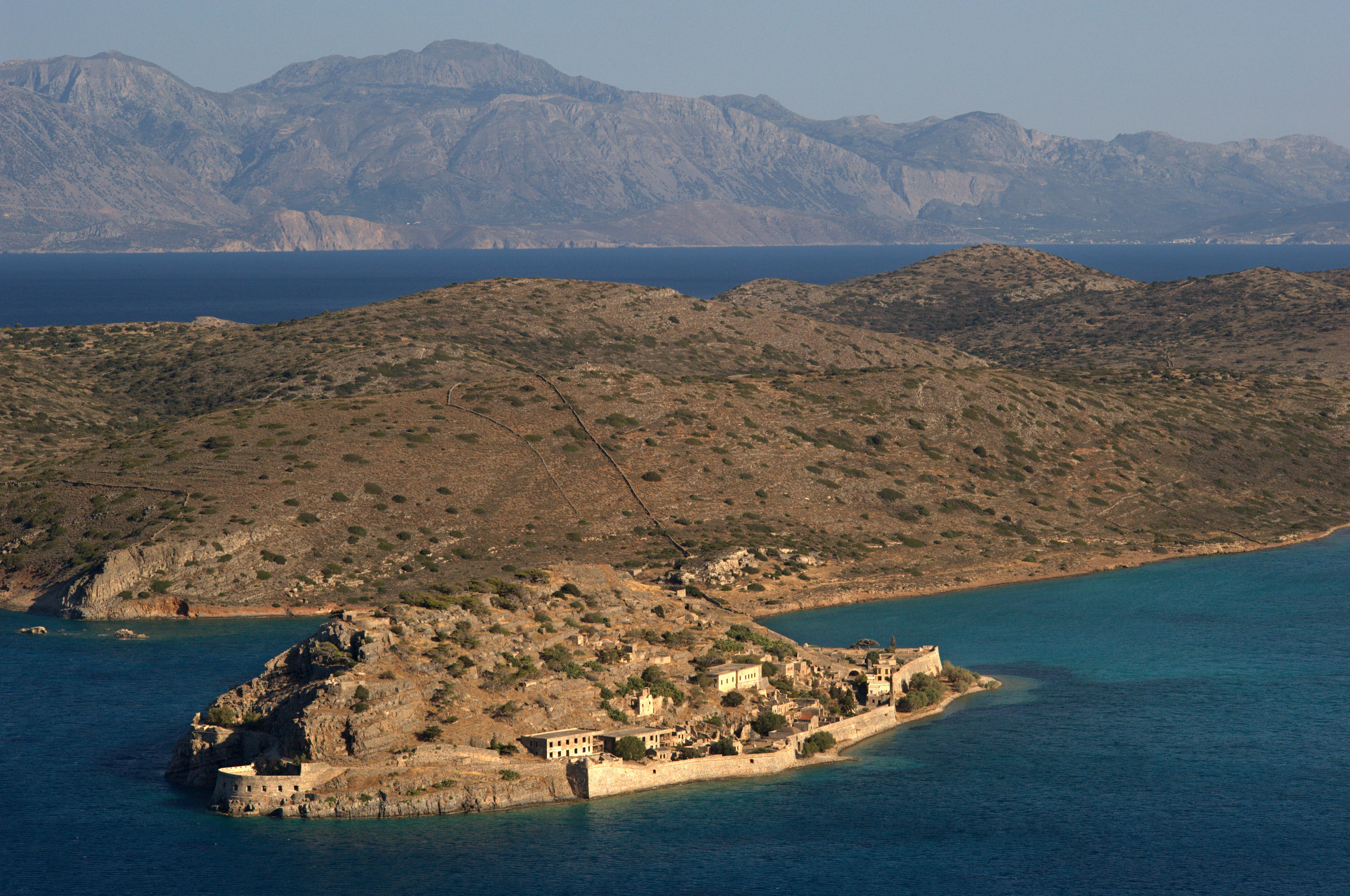
- Panoramic view from the mountain

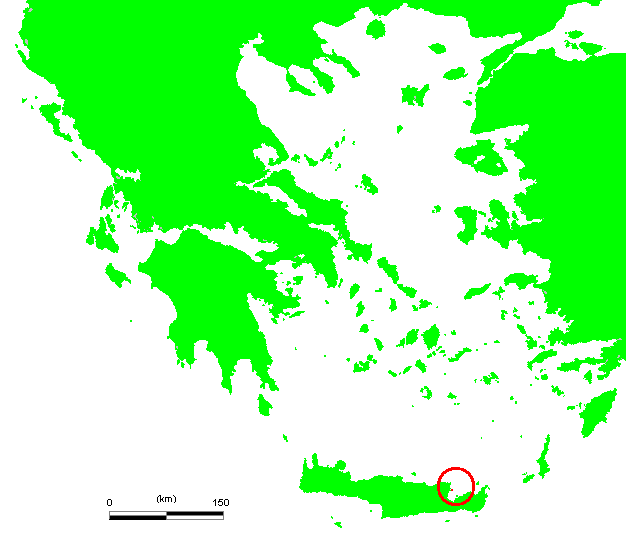

Geography
- Coordinates: 35°17′51″N 25°44′17″E
- Archipelago: Cretan Islands
- Area: 0.085 km^{2} (0.033 sq mi)

Administration
- Greece
- Region: Crete
- Regional unit: Lasithi

Demographics
- Population: 0 (2001)

Spinalonga (Greek: Σπιναλόγκα) is an island in the Gulf of Elounda, north-eastern Crete, in the municipality of Agios Nikolaos, Lasithi, next to the town of Plaka in the area of Kalydon. It is near the Spinalonga peninsula ("large Spinalonga") – which often causes confusion as the same name is used for both.

The island was maintained as a fortress for centuries under Venetian rule. It later became a refuge for Muslim families fearing persecution, and finally a leper colony in the early 20th century. It has been uninhabited since 1962; though it has undergone some restoration work in the years since. Today it is the second most visited tourist site in Crete, and sixth in Greece overall.

== Name ==
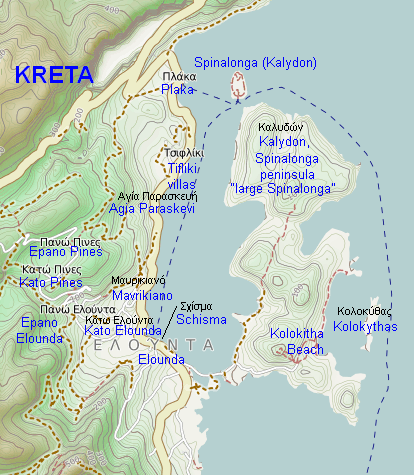
Map of Elounda, Spinalonga and surrounding areas.

According to Venetian documents, the name of the island originated in the Greek expression στην Ελούντα stin Elounda (meaning "to Elounda"). The Venetians could not understand the expression, so they familiarized it using their own language, and called it spina "thorn" longa "long", an expression that was also maintained by the locals. It has also been suggested that Spina longa may be in reference to the spine-like shape of the terrain, as seen from Elounda.

During the Ottoman period, Turkish people referred to it as "Spirlonga". This may simply have been down to mispronunciation, though it has also been suggested that this may reference a local legend of a romance between the characters Spiros and Longa. During the leper colony era (1904-1957), the island had the local nickname "the island of the living dead".

== Geography ==
Spinalonga is a rocky island situated at the northern mouth of the gulf of Elounda. Around 750m of water separates it from the village of Plaka on the Cretan mainland to the west. To the south a narrow strip of water separates it from Kolokitha island, while the east is open to the Sea of Crete. It is only 85,000 square meters in size, and largely rocky, with steep cliffs at the northern side of the island. Elsewhere the coastline features pebble beaches that retreat into shallow waters. The highest point is in the centre-south of the island, at an altitude of around 50m. There is some sparse foliage cover including fig trees, cypress, olive and pine. Prickly pears are also present on the island, though these are not native. They were brought to the island by the French or Venetians.

== History ==
=== Antiquity ===
Because of its position, the island was fortified from the ancient period in order to protect the entrance of the port of Olous. These defences fell into ruin over the following centuries. Christians hid among the ruins in the 820s to escape from Saracen invaders. The ruins were present into the early Venetian period, but little is known of them as there have never been any serious excavation works.

=== Venetian period (1210-1715) ===
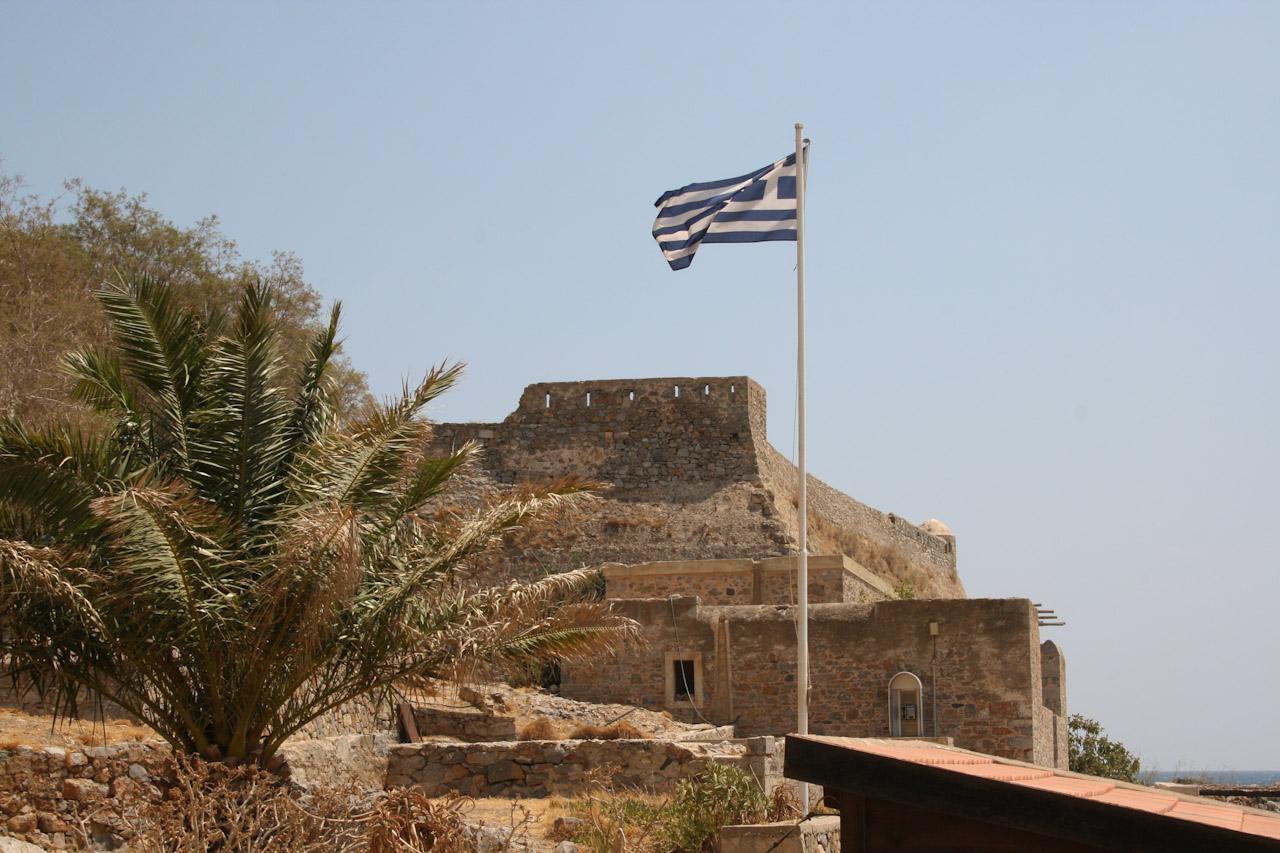
A view of the Venetian fortifications

The Venetians occupied Crete from 1210, and built a number of fortresses on the island during their rule. Spinalonga was among the last of these. The Venetians began to construct salt-pans in the shallow and salty waters of the gulf in the mid fifteenth century. Subsequently, the region acquired commercial value and became inhabited. This, in combination with the emergent Turkish threat, particularly after the Fall of Constantinople in 1453, and the continuous pirate raids, forced the Venetians to fortify the island.

The Provveditore generale Jacob Foscarini suggested fortifications for Spinalonga, and a group of engineers were sent to the island in 1574 to survey the topography. In 1578 the Venetians hired the engineer Genese Bressani to plan the island's fortifications. He created blockhouses at the highest points of the northern and southern side of the island, as well as a fortification ring along the coast that countered any hostile disembarkation. In 1579, the Provveditore generale di Candia Luca Michiel, laid the foundation stone of the fortifications, built over the ruins of an acropolis. There are two inscriptions that cite this event, one on the transom of the main gate of the castle and the other on the base of the rampart at the north side of the castle. The defences were largely built using stone from Spinalonga, as well as some stone from Olouda and Kolokitha island. In 1584, the Venetians, realising that the coastal fortifications were easy to conquer by the enemies attacking from the nearby hills, decided to strengthen their defense by constructing new fortifications at the top of the hill. The new Venetian firepower had longer range, rendering Spinalonga one of the most important sea forts in the Mediterranean basin. It was equipped with 35 cannons.

Spinalonga, along with Gramvousa and Souda, remained in Venetian hands after the rest of Crete fell to the Ottomans in the Cretan War (1645–1669). These three forts defended Venetian trade routes and were also useful bases in the event of a new Venetian-Turkish war for Crete. Many Christians found refuge in these fortresses to escape persecution from the Ottoman Turks. Iakovos Jiritas built a church in 1709 on the island, called Agios Paneteleimon after Saint Panteleimon. It only stood for six years, as it was destroyed during the last Ottoman–Venetian War.

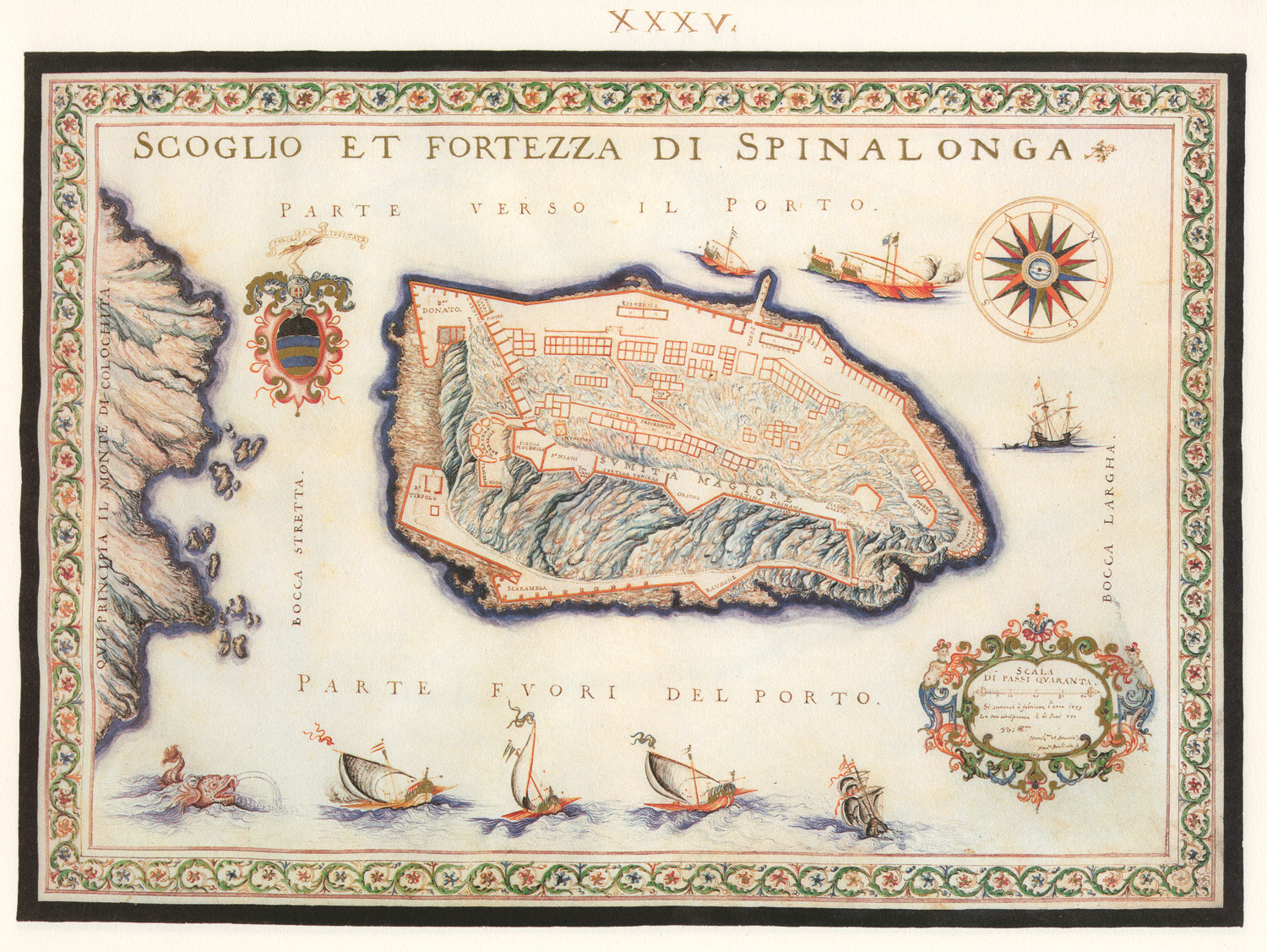
A map of Spinalonga fortress by Francesco Basilicata, 1618.

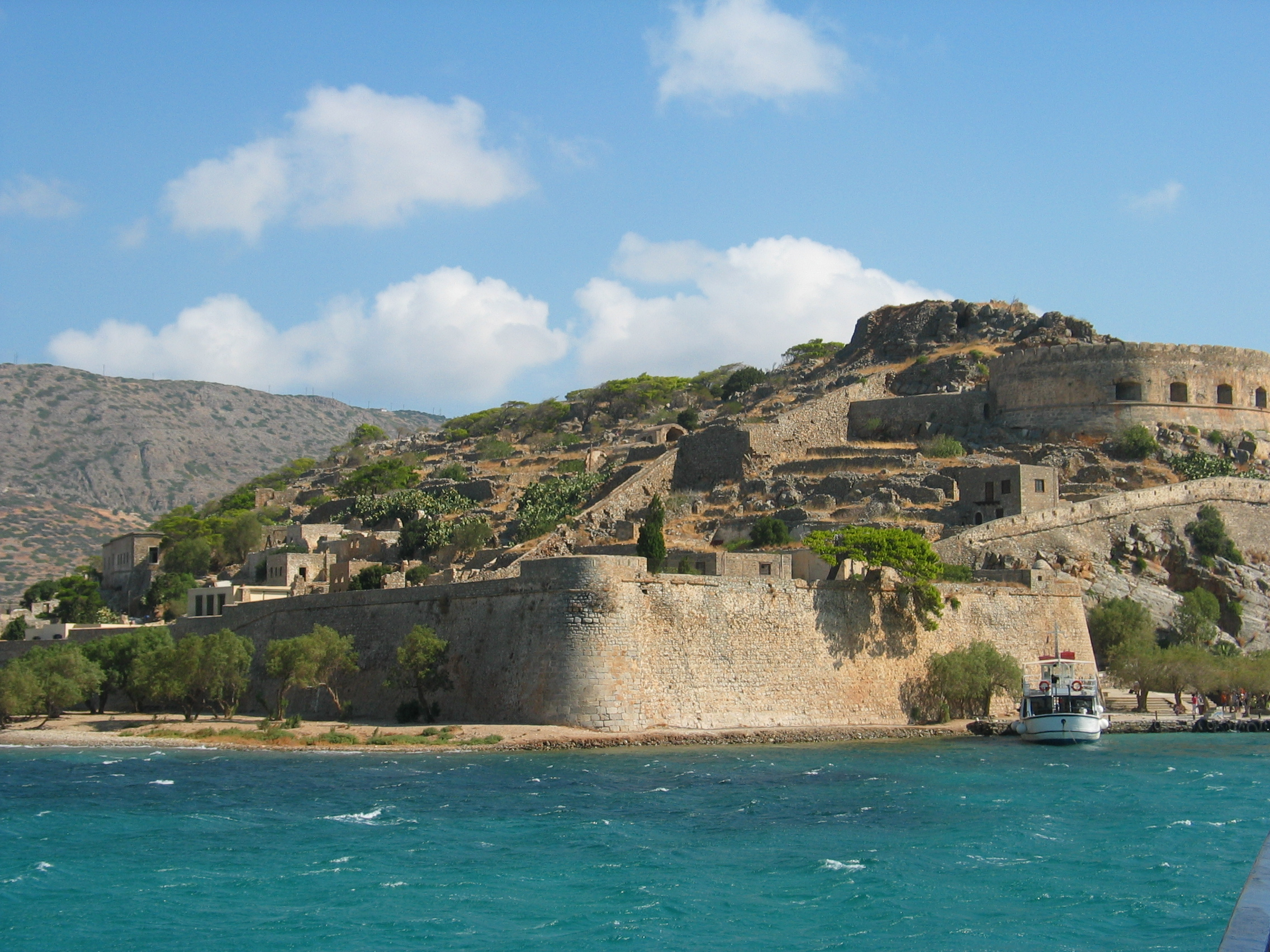
The island of Spinalonga

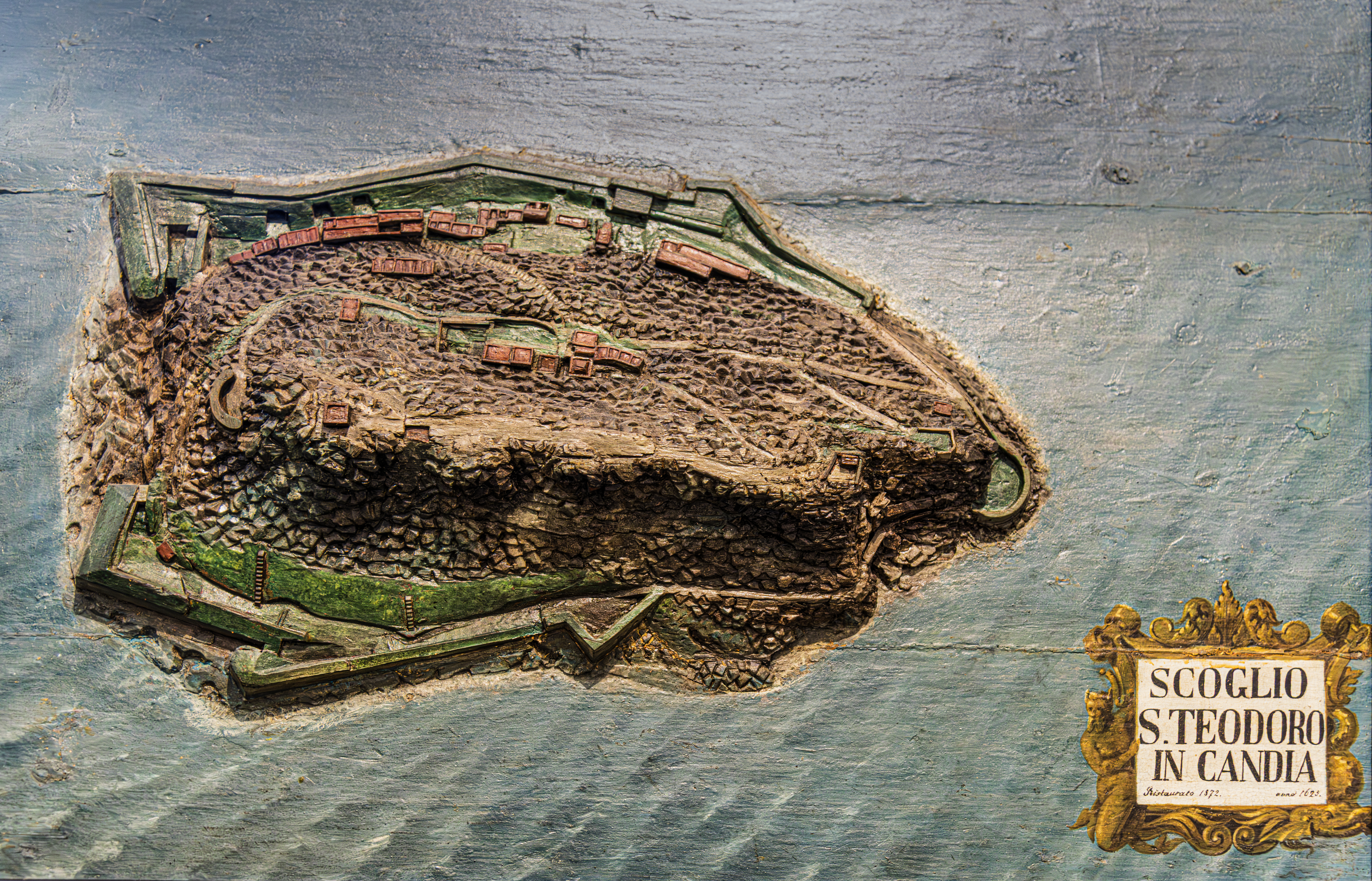
Rock of St. Theodore in Crete - Spinalonga Fortress (Naval History Museum of Venice)

=== Ottoman period (1715-1903) ===
In 1715, the island was given to the Ottomans by agreement, under the condition that the inhabitants would be safely transferred to Corfu. The Ottomans did not abide by the agreement, instead slaughtering and enslaving the locals. Spinalonga was the last remaining Venetian fortress, and the event removed the last trace of Venetian military presence from the island of Crete. Some Ottoman forces took up residence on the island and the population gradually grew over time. By 1830 there were 80 Muslim families living on Spinalonga. After the revolution of 1866 more came to the island from all across the Mirabello region, fearing Christian reprisals. During the Cretan revolt of 1878, only Spinalonga and the fortress at Ierapetra were not taken by the Christian Cretan insurgents. It became a centre for smugglers towards the end of the century. The majority of the inhabitants abandoned the island after the Ottoman defeat in 1898, though a small number of traffickers remained until 1903.

=== Leper colony (1904-1957) ===
==== Early years ====
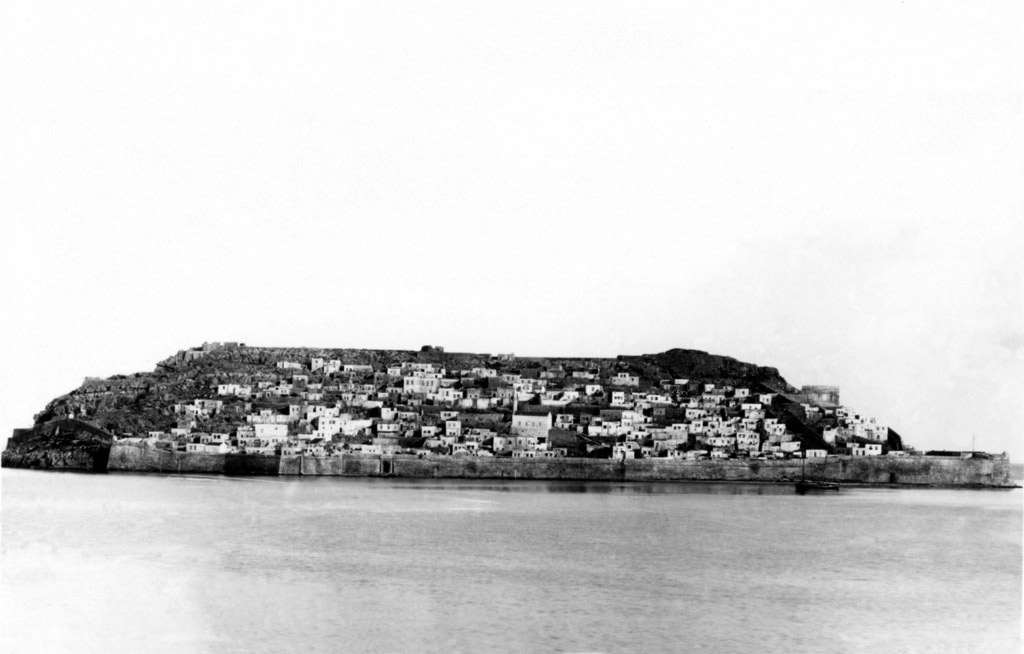
Spinalonga in 1901 by Giuseppe Gerola

The Cretan state declared in 1903 that mandatory isolation of leprosy patients would take place on Spinalonga. In this regard the Cretan government was influenced by the work of Edvard Ehlers, a Danish dermatologist and advocate for seclusion theory. This led to the forced displacement of the remaining Muslims. The first 251 lepers arrived in October 1904, and thereafter continued to arrive occasionally, sometimes while restrained. Leprosy was associated with extreme stigma at the time, and families of those who were sent to Spinalonga often avoided mentioning their connection to the place. The names of lepers were struck from the registries of their home towns when they were sent to Spinalonga.

Lepers generally arrived at the southern dock. Some sources refer to this entrance as "Dante's Gate", which allegedly bore an inscription that read "I lead to the land of grief; I lead to the endless pain; I lead towards the damned souls; Leave all hope behind”. The story is sometimes repeated by tour guides, but there is no historical evidence of such an inscription, nor such a moniker for the gate. The only similar inscription known to Maurice Born's research was one on the northwestern side which read "Boulevard of Pain".

The first arrivals settled in the lowlands of the island and destroyed the Muslim homes (from the Ottoman era), using the materials for their own construction. A graveyard was maintained for the residents, and a yellow flag flew from the highest point to warn travellers of the presence of leprosy. The island only accepted Cretan lepers until 1913, when Crete was returned to Greece; Spinalonga accepted lepers from the rest of Greece too until the Axis occupation in 1941. Some staff were present there including three street sweepers with disinfection duties, a priest and a caretaker. There were also staff paid to sanitise items that left the island, which was done with sulphur. This method of sanitisation was in actuality ineffective. Outside of the movement of the staff, travel to the island was prohibited, and fishing was forbidden beyond a radius of 200m from the shoreline.

Spinalonga was considered a place of isolation for the infected, and not intended for treatment. Conditions on the island were squalid, and there were several instances of unrest. There was little sense of community until the 1930s, with the lepers in a state of grim survivalism, focused on food, gambling and alcohol. There was some difficulty finding volunteers to bury the dead. Many attempted escape or suicide. They generally lived alone in their own homes and were reliant on the collection of rainwater, and shipments of water and food from the mainland. The inhabitants practiced folk medicine in an attempt to alleviate their symptoms, as there was no hospital or support available for them initially.

Beginning in 1925 some conditions did start to improve, as Dr. Grammatikakis arrived and began offering medical care. He would send reports back to the mainland that led to some further improvements to the island. In 1927, a visit from Charles Nicolle led to the availability of hygranol on Spinalonga. The former mosque structure was repaired and used as a medical unit in 1928.

==== The Brotherhood of the Sick ====
In 1936 a law student and young leper Epaminodas Remoundakis arrived on the island. He founded an organisation called "Brotherhood of the Sick of Spinalonga, Saint Panteleimon" with the goal of organising the community to improve conditions. Initially this was simply through cleaning the streets, improving hygiene and whitewashing the buildings. In 1938 it gained permission from the Greek government to demolish a section of the medieval fortifications and build a path around the perimeter of the island, which was accessible for handicapped lepers.

The Brotherhood was able to establish a sense of community among the residents. They would congregate on the sunny, wind protected eastern part of the island to play backgammon and checkers. Concerts were performed by lepers with musical skills. They also cultivated parts of the island, and grew fig trees. Remoundakis was able to lobby the Greek government for permission for the lepers to marry one another and maintain businesses. A café was established and a donated record player would allow patrons to listen to music. A number of children were born on the island, some of whom survived to be delivered to relatives on the mainland. A ban on mirrors was enforced by the Brotherhood, as the lepers did not want to see themselves.

World War II had a deleterious effect on conditions on the island, as Greece came under occupation by the axis powers. The loss of resupply from the mainland meant that many lepers died of malnutrition. Some swam across to the mainland and were executed by the occupiers. Conditions continued to improve after the war, with hospital access and repairs to fishing boats granted. The Brotherhood was also able to organise electrical power and a cinema for the island. Later, the Brotherhood received a donation from two benefactors in Crete and used it to build new houses for the community. Two buildings were constructed, each containing 24 rooms.

New treatments for leprosy were offered on Spinalonga from 1948, which led to a weakening of the isolation rules including short-term discharge permits. By 1952 the Greek government was pushing for the abolition of all leper hospitals in favour of a central facility in Athens. Delays to this led to hunger strikes on the island in 1953. The isolation rule was formally dropped in 1955, though Spinalonga continued to operate. The Greek director Líla Kourkoulákou shot a documentary film on Spinalonga entitled The Island of Silence. The film was groundbreaking. The fact that it depicted the actual lepers was considered controversial, as it went against the then-prevailing view of Greece in film as "a sunny country with handsome shepherds". It was screened at the Venice Film Festival, and was the first time a female Greek director had been represented at an international film festival. The controversy contributed to the closure of the island's leper colony. A British expert visited and wrote a report criticising the Greek state for its failure to care for the residents. The film was ultimately not commercially successful when it was released broadly in 1959.

The lepers were transferred to the anti-leprosy station of Agia Varvara in Attica in 1957. The last inhabitant of the island was the priest Chrysathos Katsouloyiannakis, who had come to the island from the Toplou monastic community in Siteia. He did not leave until 1962 in order to maintain the Greek Orthodox tradition of commemorating a buried person 40 days, 6 months, 1 year, 3 years, and 5 years after their death. He fell into depression in this time. After his departure, the island was left abandoned.

=== Abandonment and Born's research (1962- 2005) ===
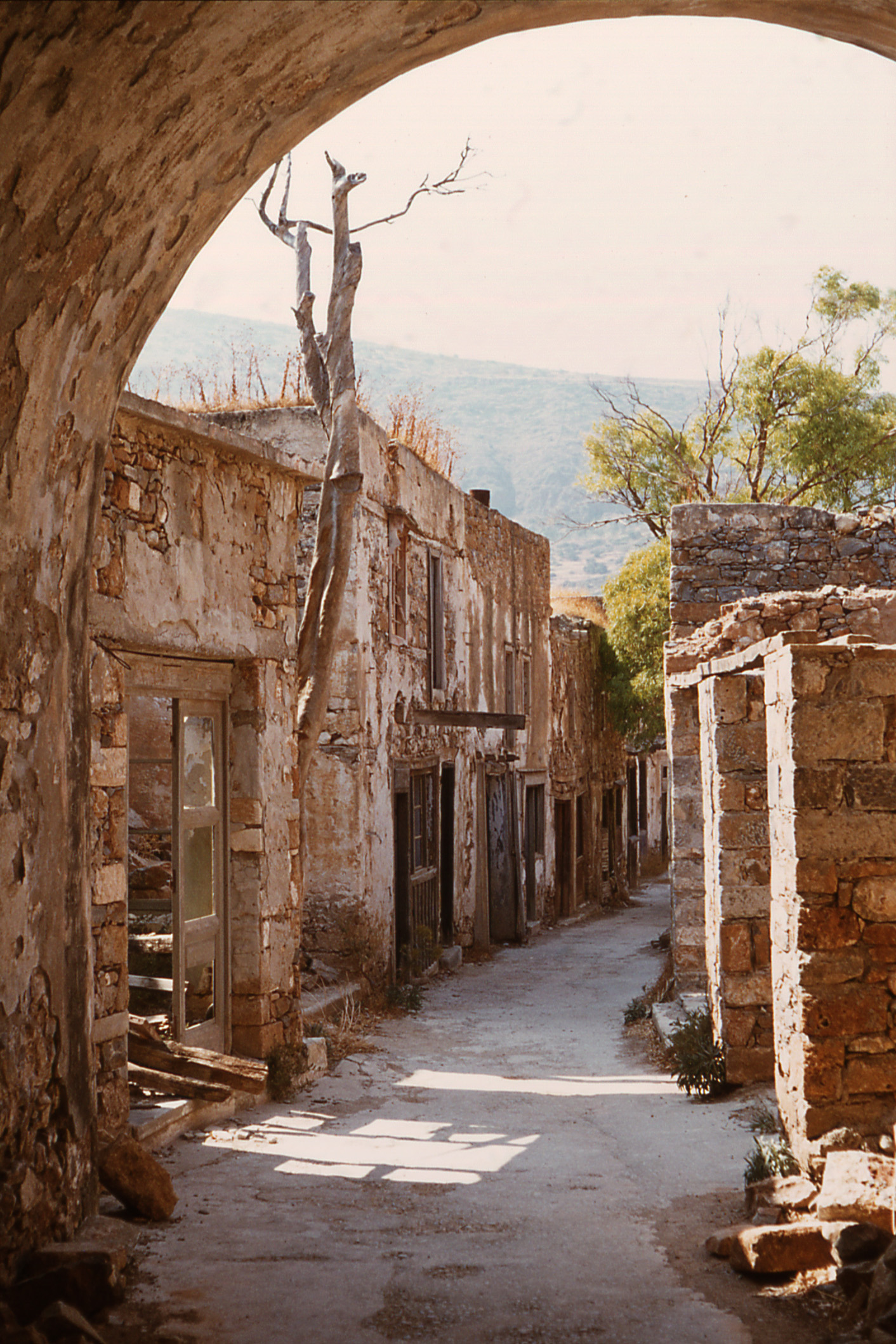
Dilapidated houses on the road in the west of the island, 1980

The island was left empty for decades after the departure of Katsouloyiannakis, and suffered from looting during the Greek junta period (1967-1974). Access to it was banned on the grounds of a fictional infection risk; the "fairytale" restriction was designed to prevent looters. The ethnographer Maurice Born, doing research on social exclusion began researching the island in 1967. He was the first academic to visit the island after its abandonment. By 1969 he was renting a home in Plaka and visiting the island daily for research, crossing over in an inflatable boat. At this time the leper colony, while deserted, was largely intact. He documented his findings on the island extensively and never took anything from it. He regretted that in later years as many artefacts were ultimately lost to looting. The island was also used as a shooting location for Werner Herzog's Last Words (1968).

Remoundakis continued his activism on behalf of lepers from hospital, aiming to raise awareness of the issue. Born made contact with the surviving former residents and co-wrote a book with Remoundakis in 1972. Born's funding, which was derived from the Paris Institute of the Environment (French: Institut de l’Environnement) ran out that year, but he was able to acquire further funding from Sandoz in exchange for also filming a documentary on the island. This became the film L'Ordre (1973).

The island was declared an archeological site in 1976, and some demolition took place in the late 1970s. Born has stated that the Greek state of the period "...seeking to erase the stain on their reputation, wanted to destroy all evidence of the leper colony." By the 1980s some tourists were starting to visit the island. Several plans were proposed for redevelopment as late as the 1990s including as an asylum and as a cultural centre. These did not eventuate; the archeologist Stelios Lekakis considers that fortunate for the preservation of the historic structures. It was made formally accessible to the public in 2000.

=== Tourism and restoration (2005- present) ===
In Born's view, the Greek government's views on the island changed in 2005- shifting from a desire to cover up the reputational damage to a desire to embrace the touristic aspect of the island. This is credited to a romanticised, erroneous version of the island's story in Victoria Hislop's novel The Island. The book was translated into 25 languages, sold millions of copies and was adapted for television. The corresponding increase in tourism was lucrative; work by UNESCO in 2016 found that 22% of tourists were visiting because of the media adaptations, while a further 40% had consumed those works.

After a problem with tourists desecrating graves, the bones of the deceased were removed and placed in a ossuary next to the cemetery with new plaques in 2013. European Union funding was granted in 2014 to restore 16 structures and improve accessibility on the island. The Greek government applied to UNESCO in 2014 for the island to be approved as a World Heritage Site. The application referenced the many eras of architecture present, as well as the human tragedy of the leper colony. A third phase of funding in 2018 reinforced the southwestern wall and maintained market buildings, while funding approved in 2023 added accessible exhibition spaces.

Today, the uninhabited island is a popular tourist attraction in Crete. The island can easily be accessed from Plaka, Elounda and Agios Nikolaos. Tourist boats depart regularly from all three towns, and the island receives hundreds of thousands of visitors per year. A small snack bar is present near the dock. It is the second most-visited location in Crete (after the Palace of Knossos), and sixth in Greece overall.

== Significance ==
Spinalonga was one of the last active leper colonies in Europe. While historically a devastating condition, modern treatments now exist. Isolation of patients has not been medically necessary since the 1940s, but in many developed countries continued until the 1980s. The remaining leper colonies in Europe generally have a very small population of elderly lepers who contracted the illness before widespread availability of treatment. Surviving colonies include Tichilești in eastern Romania, Fontilles in Spain and Talsi in Latvia. As of 2022, Europe was on the brink of declaring a total end to local transmission of leprosy.

== In popular culture ==
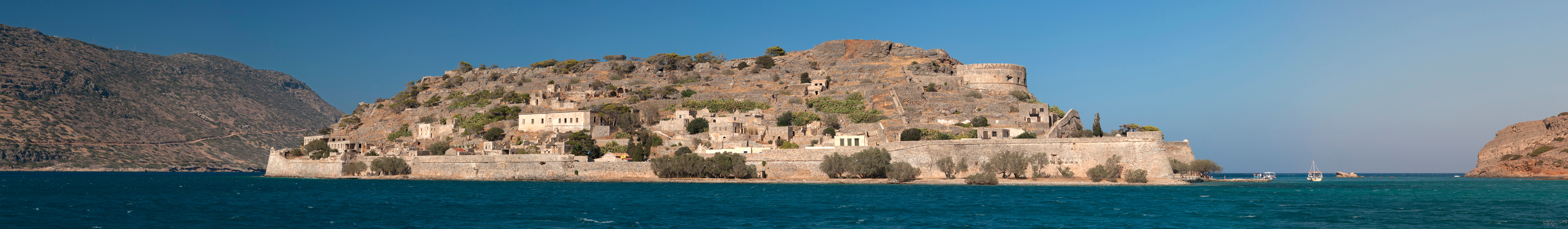
The west bank of Spinalonga

=== Literature ===
- Spinalonga: Ad Vitam (1933), a novel by T. Kornaros.
- The Touching of Wood (1995), a short story by Ali Smith set on the island. Published in Free Love and Other Stories.
- The Island (2005), a novel by Victoria Hislop, the story of a family's ties to the leper colony.
- Spinalonga (2008), a short story by John Ware about a tourist group that visits the island. Included in the 13th Pan Book of Horror.

=== Film & television ===
- Crete Without the Gods (1935), a Cretan documentary which included a scene of the leper colony.
- The Island of Silence (1959), a film by Líla Kourkoulákou, which was shot on the island.
- Last Words (1968), an experimental short film by Werner Herzog. It was partially shot on the island and focuses on the closure of the colony.
- L'Ordre (1973), a documentary by Jean-Daniel Pollet on the abandoned leper colony, and in particular Raimondakis.
- Who Pays the Ferryman? (1977), a television series. Spinalonga featured in the background of the episode A River to Cross.
- To Nisi (2010), a television adaptation of Hislop's novel.

== Sources ==
- Detorakis, Theocharis (1988). "Η Τουρκοκρατία στην Κρήτη" [Turkish rule in Crete]. In Panagiotakis, Nikolaos M. (ed.). Crete, History and Civilization (in Greek). Vol. II. Vikelaia Library, Association of Regional Associations of Regional Municipalities. pp. 333–436.
- Maltezou, Chrysa A. (1988). "Η Κρήτη κατα τη Βενετοκρατία" [Crete under Venetian rule]. In Panagiotakis, Nikolaos M. (ed.). Crete, History and Civilization (in Greek). Vol. II. Vikelaia Library, Association of Regional Associations of Regional Municipalities. pp. 105–162.
- Remoundakis, Epaminondas; Born, Maurice (2015). Vies et Morts d'un Crétois lépreux. Toulouse: Éditions Anacharsis. ISBN 9791027901715.
- Spyropoulos, Giannis (2018). "Το οθωμανικό φρούριο της Σπιναλόγκας από την κατάκτησή του (1715) μέχρι τις αρχές του 19ου αιώνα" [The Ottoman Fortress of Spinalonga from its Conquest (1715) to the Early 19th Century]. Πεπραγμένα του ΙΑ′ Διεθνούς Κρητολογικού Συνεδρίου, Ρέθυμνο, 21-27 Οκτωβρίου 2011. Τόμος Γ1: Νεότεροι Χρόνοι – Σύγχρονη Εποχή (in Greek). Rethymno: Historical and Folklore Society of Rethymno. pp. 9–35.
- Hislop, Victoria (2005). The Island. Headline Review. ISBN 9780755309511.
- Hislop, Victoria (2008). La Isla. Spain: Nabla Ediciones. ISBN 978-84-92461-00-4.
- Zorbas, Victor. Spinalonga, The Isle of the Damned.
- Spinalonga-Paradise or Purgatory? (1986) by Beryl Darby. The Star, 46,1,6–16, (The only one reference concerning the Spinalonga leprosy colony.)
- Lekakis, Stelios (2017). "The Spinalonga Blues; notes from the field". Archaeology & Arts (online edition, archaeology.wiki)
