= Kalydon =

Kalydon might mean:

- Calydon, ancient city in Aetolia, Greece
- Kalydon, uninhabited island area near the city of Elounda, Crete, Greece
