= Plaka, Lasithi =

Village in Crete, Greece

Coordinates: 35.299°N 25.728°E

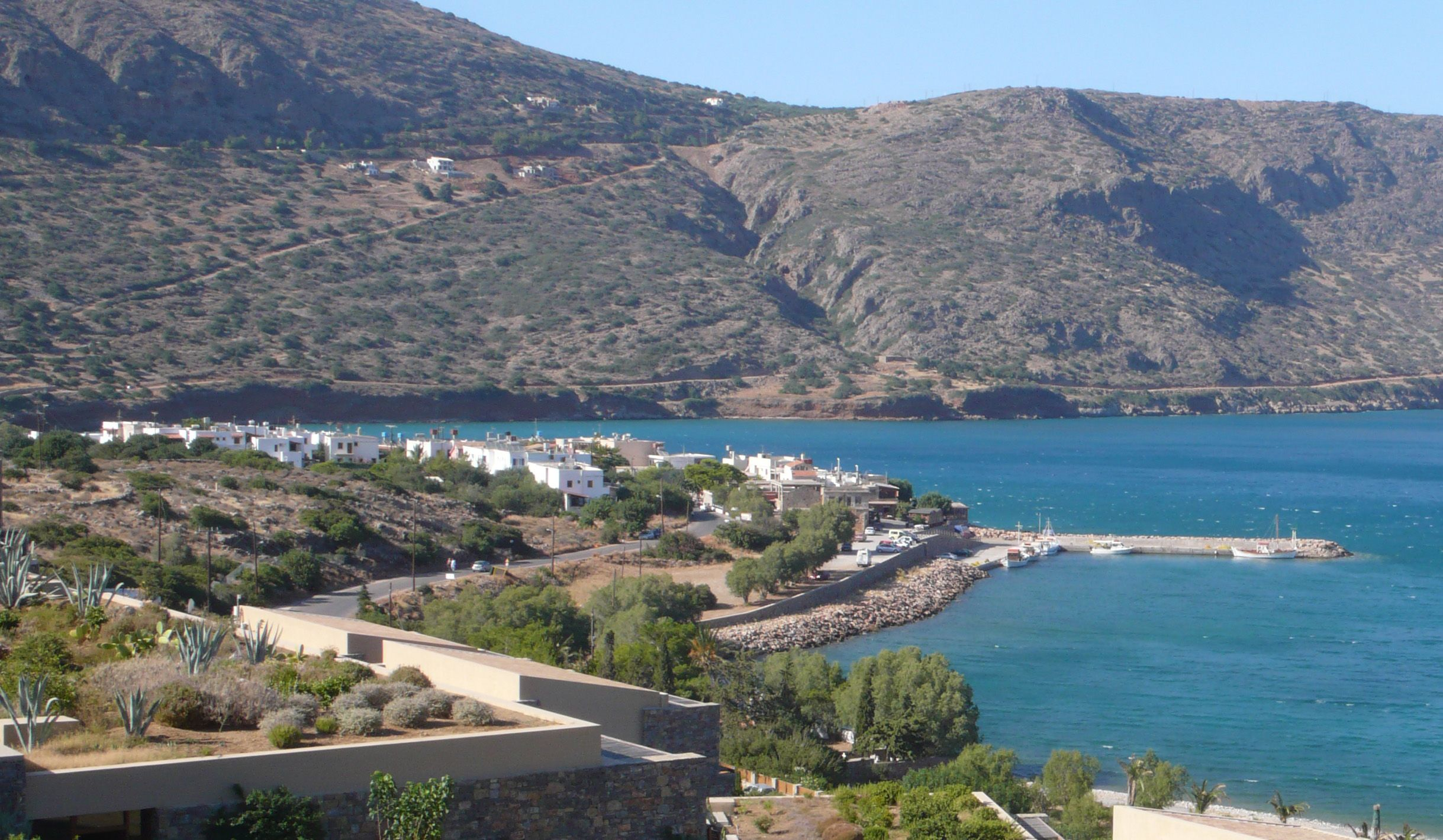
Plaka

Plaka is a village in Lasithi, Crete. It is part of the community Vrouchas, in the municipality of Agios Nikolaos. It neighbours the town of Elounda and is close to the historical island of Spinalonga. In the vicinity are the ancient cities (now in ruins) of Olous and Lato, which Dorian settlements were frequently in conflict with each other over territory disputes. Tourist boats depart from Plaka to Spinalonga on a daily basis. The one way boat passage requires approximately ten minutes.

The village features prominently in the novel The Island by Victoria Hislop and its TV adaptation To Nisi.
