= Elounda =

Elounda Ελούντα
- Community
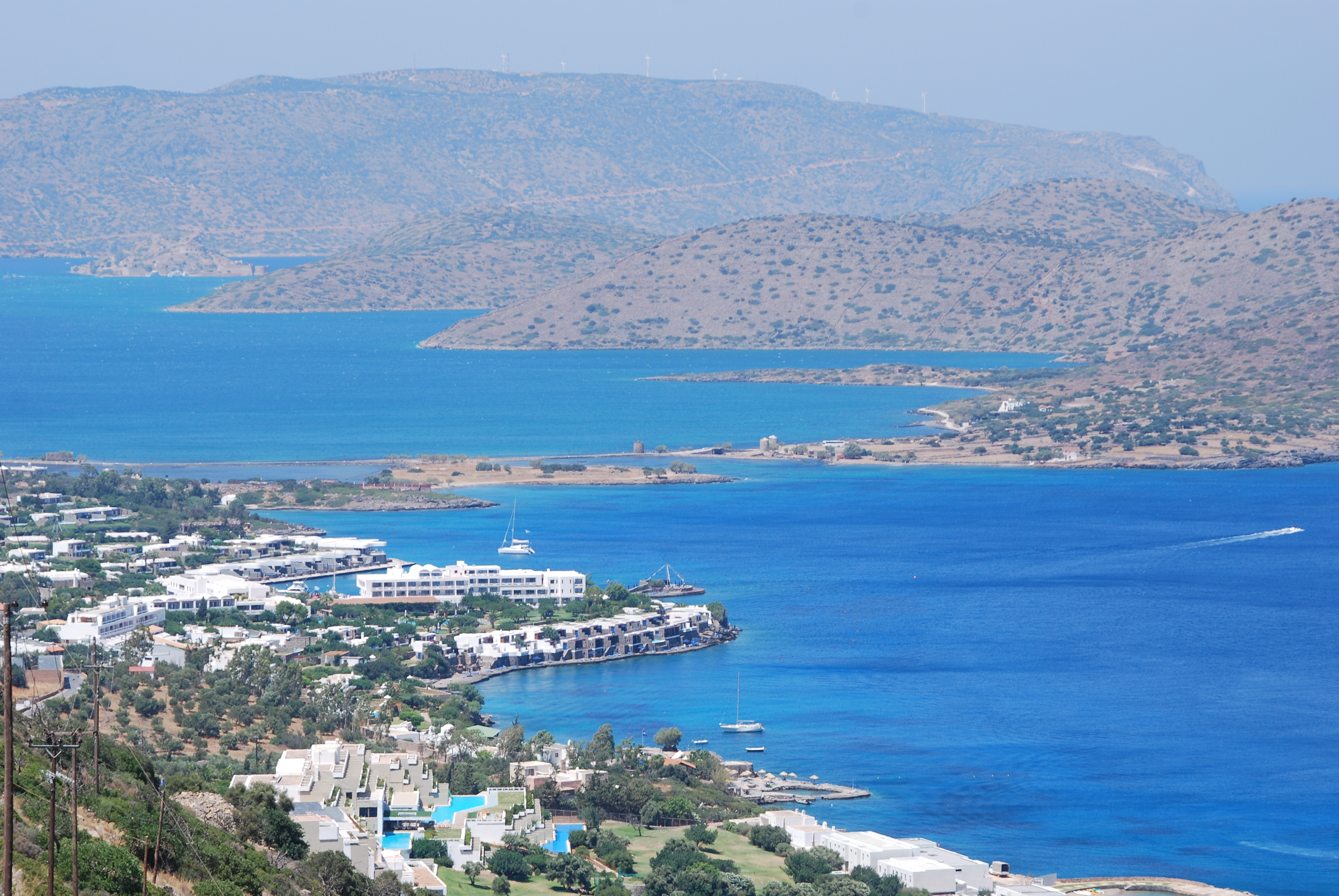
- Overview of Elounda

- Location within Greece
- Coordinates: 35°16′N 25°43′E
- Country: Greece
- Administrative region: Crete
- Regional unit: Lasithi
- Municipality: Agios Nikolaos
- Municipal unit: Agios Nikolaos
- Elevation: 5 m (16 ft)

Population (2021)
  - Community: 2,254
- Time zone: UTC+2 (EET)
  - Summer (DST): UTC+3 (EEST)
- Postal code: 720 53
- Area code: 28410
- Vehicle registration: ΑΝ
- Website: http://www.dimosagn.gr

Elounda (Greek: Ελούντα, romanized: Elúnda), alternatively transliterated as Elounta or Elouda, is a small town on the northern coast of the island of Crete, Greece. It is part of the municipality of Agios Nikolaos.

== Settlement structure ==
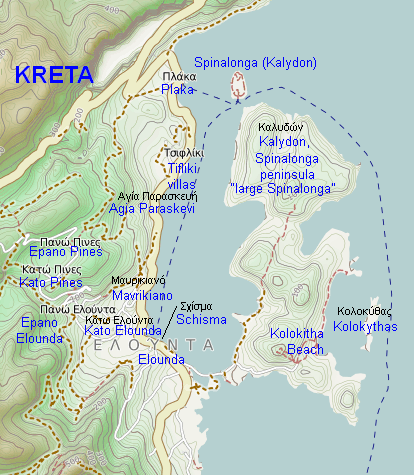
Map of Elounda, Spinalonga and surrounding areas.

Elounda is formed of seven villages and an uninhabited island area. The village of Schisma is by far the most populated one and is often understood as 'Elounda Centre'. The community of Elounda has a total of 2,254 inhabitants according to the 2021 census. The areas making up the community are (at least since the re-organisation of 2011-01-01) with Greek names:

- Agia Paraskevi – Ἁγία Παρασκευή
- Epano Elounda – Ἐπάνω Ἐλοῦντα
- Epano Pine – Ἐπάνω Πιναί
- Kalydon – Καλυδών (uninhabited island area)
- Kato Elounda – Κάτω Ἐλοῦντα
- Kato Pine – Κάτω Πιναί
- Mavrikianon – Μαυρικιανόν
- Schisma – Σχίσμα

The area of Kalydon is made up of the island of Spinalonga, the Peninsula Spinalonga and the island of Kolokythas along with other smaller maritime structures.

== Geography and neighbourhood ==
The road into Elounda from Agios Nikolaos is approximately 12 km in length and follows the shore as it climbs to the top of a small mountain. On a clear day it is possible to see the whole of Mirabello Bay and all the way to the eastern tip of Crete.

The small fishing village of Plaka (Lasithi), which overlooks the island of Spinalonga and the Kolikithia Peninsula, is located a mere 5 km from the main square of Elounda heading north away from Agios Nikolaos.

It is also the closest major town to the former leper colony of Spinalonga (Greek: Σπιναλόγκα), located on an island officially named Kalydon (Greek: Καλυδών).

Elounda is a tourist attraction, visited by VIPs for its seaside luxury resorts. Greek prime minister Andreas Papandreou used to spend his summers in Elounda; today, it is visited almost every year by the royal family of Saudi Arabia.

== History ==
The earliest recorded settlement at Elounda was the ancient Greek city of Olous, whose people were in intermittent conflict with the citizens of Dorian Lato, until a peace treaty was eventually reached. Elounda has a later history as part of the Venetian era. Elounda has changed considerably during its lifespan. The bulk of the ancient city of Olous was reclaimed by the sea towards the end of the Ancient Greek period and is still visible, in part, when diving in the bay of Elounda.

During the early 20th century, Elounda acted as a stopping off point for lepers being transported to the leper colony at Spinalonga.

In the 1930s the enclosed waters between Elounda and the Spinalonga peninsula (known as "Mirabella Harbour") was used by Imperial Airways flying boats as a landing, for long-range flights to the Middle East and beyond. In August 1936 it was the scene of a fatal crash by IA's Scipio, and a few months later on 28 December IA's City of Alexandria was wrecked in a storm while moored overnight.

In 1984, the Prime minister of Greece, Andreas Papandreou, the President of France, François Mitterrand, and Colonel Muammar Gaddafi of Libya met in a luxurious Elounda resort to discuss conflict resolution in Chad.

== Public transport ==
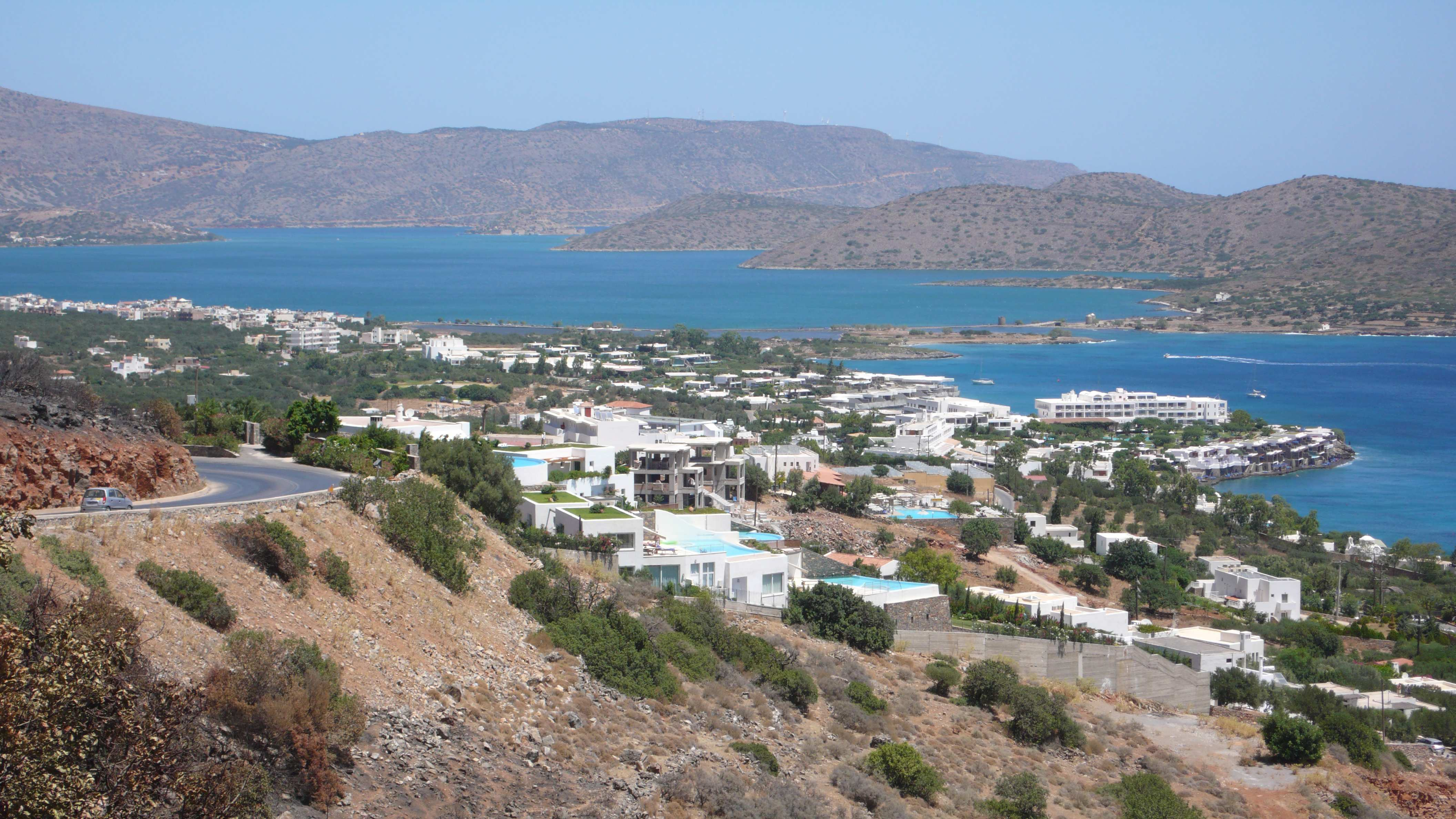
Elounda

Bus services in Elounda are operated by the KTEL (Greek: ΚΤΕΛ) bus company, with scheduled services running to Plaka (Lasithi) and Agios Nikolaos throughout the day.

== In fiction ==
- Elounda is the setting for the 1964 Walt Disney mystery film The Moon-Spinners, where it was filmed.
- Elounda was used for the filming of the BBC television series Who Pays the Ferryman? in the late 1970s.
- It is the setting for Belinda Jones' novel Out of the Blue.
- It features in Victoria Hislop's novel The Island, the novel which has also been adapted for Greek television and aired as a mini series in the winter of 2010-11.

== Sources ==
- Hislop, Victoria (2005). The Island. ISBN 9780755309511.
