= Henri-Alexandre Danlos =

French physician and dermatologist (1844–1912)

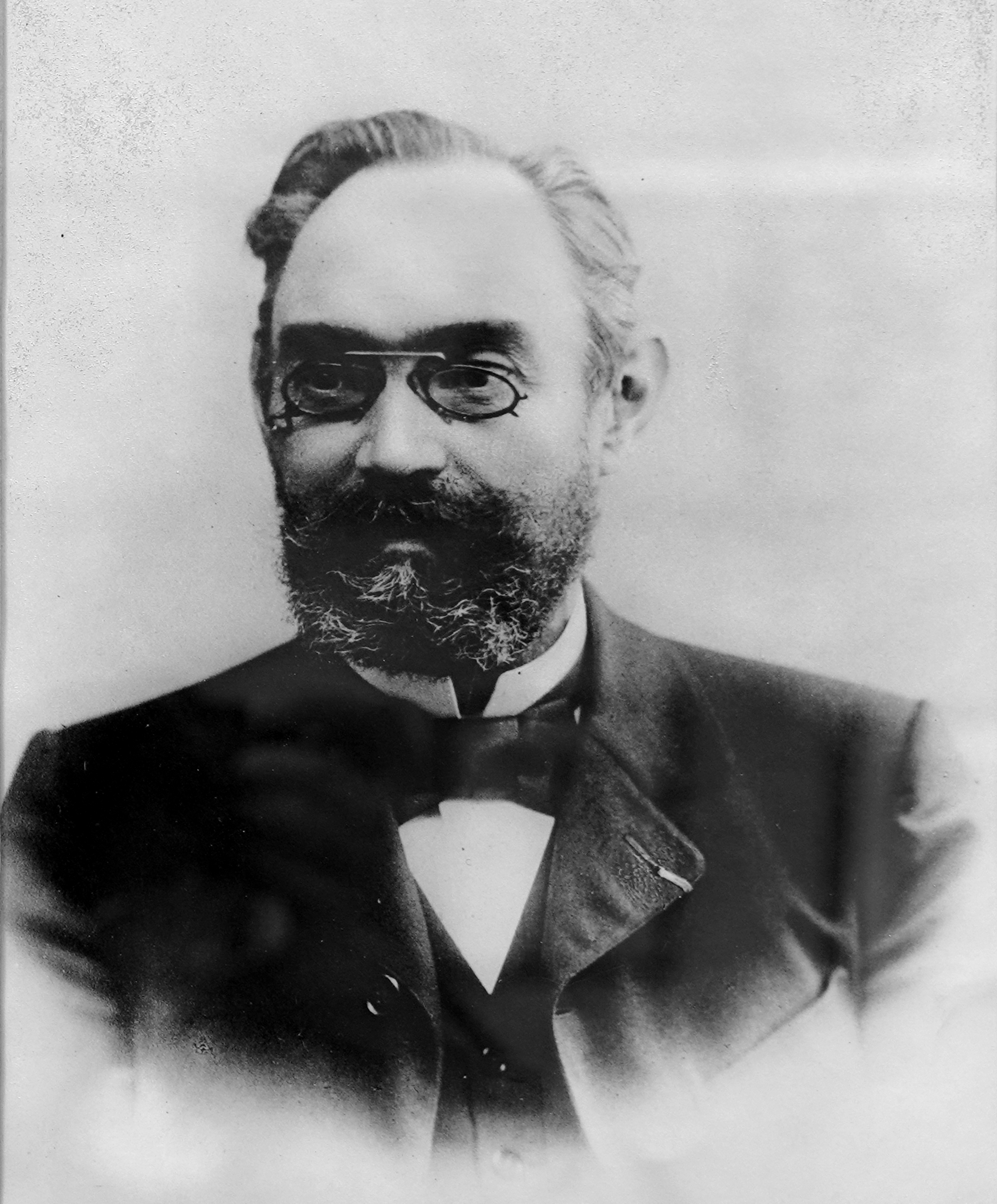

Henri-Alexandre Danlos (/ˈdænlɒs/, French pronunciation: [ɑ̃ʁi alɛksɑ̃dʁ(ə) dɑ̃los]; 26 March 1844 – 12 September 1912) was a French physician and dermatologist born in Paris. A group of inherited connective tissue disorders, the Ehlers–Danlos syndromes, have been named after both him and Danish dermatologist Edvard Ehlers (1863–1937).

He studied medicine in Paris, and during the early part of his career performed research in the laboratory of Charles-Adolphe Wurtz (1817–1884). In 1881, he became médecin des hôpitaux, and four years later was chef de service at the Hôpital Tenon in Paris. In 1895, he received an appointment at the Hôpital Saint-Louis.

Danlos was a pioneer in the use of radium for treatment of lupus erythematosus of the skin, and in 1901 with physicist Eugène Bloch (1878–1944), he was the first to apply radium on tuberculous skin lesions.
