= Kalydon (Elounda) =

Uninhabited Island near Crete, Greece

Native name: Καλυδών
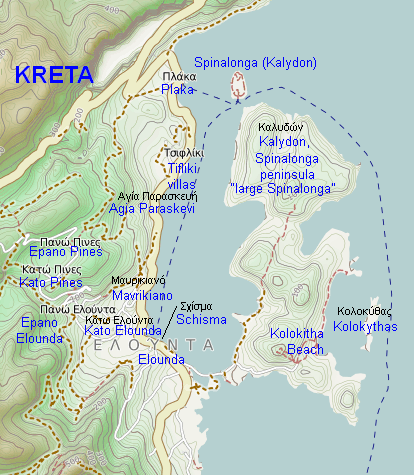
- Map of Elounda, Spinalonga and surrounding areas
- Interactive map of Kalydon (Elounda)

Administration
- Greece

Kalydon (Greek: Καλυδών) is an uninhabited island area near to and belonging to Elounda, Crete, Greece. It is made up of the island of Spinalonga, the Peninsula Spinalonga and the island of Kolokythas along with other smaller islets. The term Kalydon is often applied to each of the Spinalonga islands as their alternate historic name that was further re-established in modern Greek naming, whilst Spinalonga is still the preferred naming in the public.

In 1834, a population of 81 Muslim families is attested in the area. After the 1866 revolution a lot of other Cretan Muslims from other areas moved in. During the Cretan revolt of 1878, only Spinalonga and the fortress at Ierapetra were not taken by the Christian Cretan insurgents. In 1881 the 1112 Muslims formed their own community. When the island Spinalonga became a leper colony in 1903, the last Turks left the place.
