= Spinalonga Peninsula =

Peninsula in Greece

Coordinates: 35°16′30″N 25°44′40″E

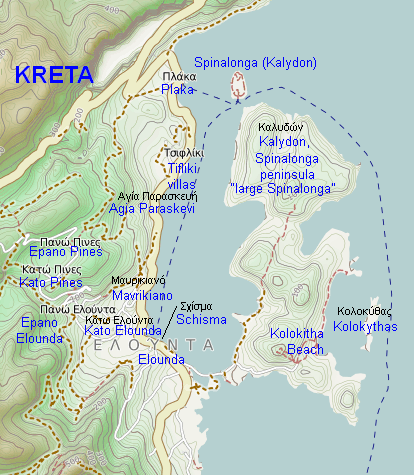
Map of Elounda, Spinalonga and surrounding areas.

The Spinalonga Peninsula is part of the uninhabited Kalydon island area within the region of Elounda, Crete, Greece. To its north, the true island of Spinalonga can be found. To its east the island of Kolokythas can be found partially enclosing a bay. The beach on the peninsula is called Kolokita beach due to its view across to the neighbouring island. The peninsula is sometimes also called Kalydon (or sometimes erroneously assumed to bear the name Kolokythas due to the name of the beach). Sometimes the peninsula is called "large Spinalonga" or "big Spinalonga" to distinguish it from the much smaller island of Spinalonga to the north.

In the south-west of the peninsula, a road leads across a causeway from the mainland. A small sea channel runs under the road, under a stone bow bridge built in 1897 by the French army. This allows vehicle access to the peninsula. The road is guarded by three former windmill towers, two of which have very flat, cone-shaped roofs. On the coast, former salt-drying areas now provide a home for many varieties of birds, including a population of flamingos. There is a Christian church - the Church of St Luke - on a hill in the south-east of the peninsula, close to the road to the beach.
