= George Bobolas =

Greek businessman (1928–2023)

- Born: 14 February 1928; Piraeus, Greece
- Died: 11 April 2023 (aged 95); Athens, Greece
- Occupations: Businessman, publisher
- Years active: 1976–2023
- Known for: Shareholder of Pegasus Publishing S.A; Shareholder of Athens Mont Parnes Casino
- Spouse: Anna Bobola (1955 died 2013)
- Children: 3

George Bobolas (Greek: Γιώργος Μπόμπολας; 14 February 1928 – 11 April 2023) was a Greek construction and media businessman.

== Biography ==
Bobolas developed properties all over the Balkans, Europe and the Near East for over four decades. He was also a media magnate owning the Greek TV Mega Channel and several magazines and newspapers, part of Attiki Odos, 49% of the Parnitha Casino and gold mines in Italy and Greece. He had 5.62% of the voting rights of Pegasus Publishing S.A, which is listed on the Athens Stock Exchange (Athex: PEGAS).

Bobolas died on 11 April 2023, at the age of 95.
