= Mega Channel =

Greek television network

MEGA Channel
- Country: Greece
- Broadcast area: Domestic
- Headquarters: 340 Syngrou Avenue, Kallithea, Athens, Greece

Programming
- Language: Greek
- Picture format: 1080i HDTV (downscaled to 16:9 aspect ratio 576i for the SDTV feed)

Ownership
- Owner: Alter Ego Media S.A.
- Sister channels: Mega News; One Channel

History
- Launched: 20 November 1989; 17 February 2020 (relaunch)

Links
- Website: www.megatv.com

Availability

Terrestrial
- Digea: All over Greece at local frequencies

Streaming media
- Live Streaming: Official Web TV

MEGA Channel, also known as MEGA TV or just MEGA, is a television network in Greece, that broadcasts a mix of foreign and Greek programming. It is the first and the oldest private television network in Greece.

== History ==
=== Mega Channel (1989–2018) ===
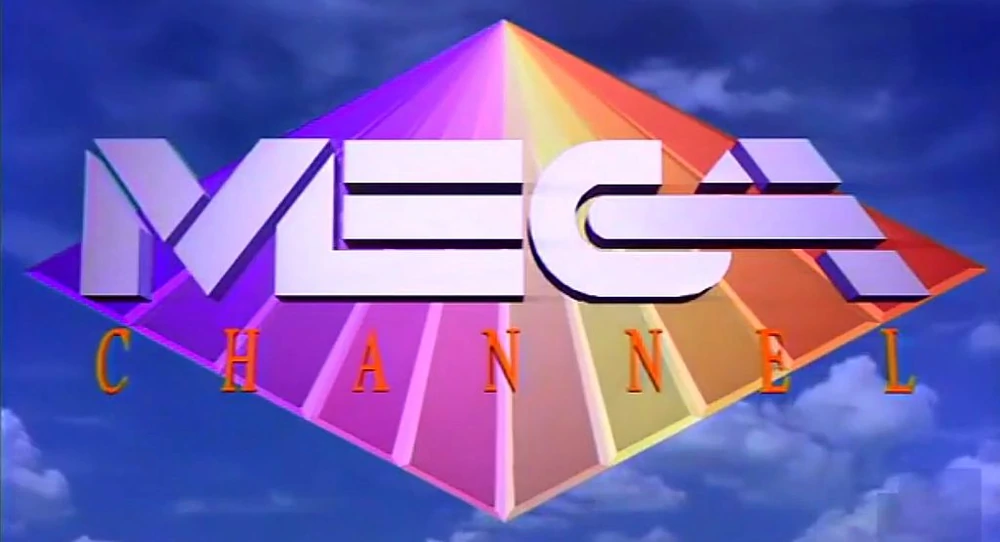
Old Mega Channel logo (1989–1999)

Mega is the first private television station to launch in Greece on the 20th of November in 1989 and was the trade name of Teletypos S.A. (Τηλέτυπος A.E.)

The channel regularly achieved the top ratings spot in Greece through its varied programming including comedies, dramas, news, current affairs and entertainment shows. Examples include the popular Greek comedies Sto Para Pente, Savatogenimmenes and Maria, i Aschimi.

The channel was also granted the rights to Victoria Hislop's novel The Island. This became a 26 episode drama series called To Nisi. The show was the most expensive show in Greek television history with a budget of €4 million.

=== Financial problems and subsequent closure ===
Since 2012, the parent company had been experiencing financial issues due to poor borrowing practises. In 2016, the channels debts were reported to be approximately €116 million. At the same time, reports of staff being unpaid began to emerge.

In 2016, it was reported that the company was restructuring loans in order to continue operations. This was despite the fact the company didn't proceed with a share capital increase of 15 million euros that was agreed in exchange for the banks agreeing to extend their return to 2021.

The staff of Mega Channel continued to keep the channel on air despite not being paid and being ignored by the parent company. The decision was taken to cease all news and live programming and instead focus on rebroadcasting content from their extensive program library without commercial breaks.

Mega continued broadcasting until it was removed from the platforms. The channel was removed by Digea (the company responsible for digital over-the-air broadcasting in Greece) at 02:08:36 on the morning of 28 October 2018. The channel was then also removed from pay-TV platforms on 20 November 2018. The channel did continue to broadcast via online streaming from its webpage.

=== Sale of assets ===
On 1 November 2019, the Mega Channel branding, logo and vast program library were put up for auction.

The winning bid of €33,999,999 belonged to Alter Ego Media S.A.

=== Mega Channel (2020–present) ===
Following the auction, plans were put in place to re-launch Mega.

On 17 February 2020, the channel relaunched with a variety of live programming, news, movies and selected programs from its program library.

The channel was using the familiar 'Mega Mou' (My Mega) on-screen branding that was originally used between 2010 and 2014 as well as the new tag line of Mega όπως πάντα! (Mega as always!).

However, on June 27, 2021, the channel retired the 'Mega Mou' branding and began to use a new ident package in which objects form the logo.

=== Broadcasting licences and regulation ===
Like other private television broadcasters in Greece, MEGA Channel operated for many years under temporary broadcasting arrangements while the national licensing framework for private television was being finalised. During the 1990s and 2000s, the channel continued nationwide broadcasting alongside other major networks while participating in successive licensing procedures.

In the late 2010s, the introduction of a revised licensing process for nationwide television channels resulted in significant changes to the broadcasting landscape. MEGA did not secure a nationwide licence during the 2018 tender, which contributed to the cessation of its terrestrial broadcasting later that year. Following its acquisition by Alter Ego Media, the channel returned to air under a new licensing framework.

== Current programming ==
Programming for the 2026-2027 broadcasting season includes:

=== Greek ===
Current shows include:

- Koinonia Ora Mega (Community Time MEGA) - A revamped version of its predecessor (Koinonia Ora 8). Current affairs show that examines the issues affecting everyday people in Greece and abroad. Features discussion with in-studio guests. The show is hosted by Iordanis Hasapopoulos and Anthi Voulgari. Airs Monday - Friday at 05:40.
- Live News - hosted by Nikos Evaggelatos. Airs Monday - Friday at 15:40.
- Ekselikseis Tora - hosted by Anastasia Giamali. Airs Weekends at 15:20.
- Mega Gegonota (Mega News) - Daily newscast in Greek featuring news from Greece and around the world. Airs daily 12:45 & 19:45 (hosted by Dora Anagnostopoulou at 12:45, Nikitas Koronakis on weekdays except Fridays at 19:45, Katerina Panagopoulou on Fridays and weekends at 19:45 and Katerina Nonta on weekends at 12:45).
- Mega Savvatokiriako (Mega Weekend) - Morning show for the weekend. It features news, sports highlights, current affairs and more. Hosted by Dinos Siomopoulos and Stella Gadona. Airs Saturday & Sunday at 05:40.
- MEGA Stories - hosted by Dora Anagnostopoulou. Airs Tuesday at 00:10.
- Megali Eikona - hosted by Niki Lymberaki. Airs Thursday at 00:10.
- Super Balla Live - Sports Broadcast hosted by Antonis Karpetopoulos. Every Sunday at 23:50.
- Hamogela Kai Pali! - hosted by Sissy Christidou. Airs Monday - Friday at 9:20.
- Fos Sto Tounel - hosted by Aggeliki Nikolouli. Airs Fridays at 23:20.
- The Chase - hosted by Maria Mpekatorou. Airs Monday - Sunday at 18:30.
- Al Tsantiri Niouz - hosted by Lakis Lazopoulos. Airs specific Wednesdays or Thursdays at 21:00.

Current series include:

- I ntanta tis geitonias - comedy. Air dates not yet specified
- Dyo mayra poukamisa - drama
- Oi Athooi - drama
- Camping - comedy

=== Foreign series ===
- Mr. Mercedes - American crime drama.
- For Life - American legal drama.
- Forensic Files - American documentary-style.
- Outlander - American historical drama.
- When Calls the Heart - Canadian-American romantic drama.
- CSI: Miami - American police procedural drama.

=== Sports broadcasting rights ===
- UEFA Champions League (best pick on Wednesday and Thursday)
- UEFA Super Cup
- UEFA Women's Champions League
- UFC

== Reporters ==
- Nikitas Koronakis: Presenter of the main news bulletin
- Yannis Pretenteris: Newscast commentator
- Gina Moscholiou: Permanent and main commentator of the bulletin
- George Papachristos: Permanent and main commentator of the bulletin
- Katerina Panagopoulou: Presenter of the main news bulletin on weekends
- Velika Karavaltsiou: Presenter of the midday newscast on weekends
- Katerina Nonta: Police editor and presenter of the midday newscast on weekends
- Dora Anagnostopoulou: Presenter of the daily noon news bulletin
- Georgina Malliarozi: Presenter of the midday newscast on weekends
- Eleftheria Davatzi: Presenter of the midday newscast on weekends

== Production and studios ==
MEGA Channel’s primary production facilities are located at its headquarters on Syngrou Avenue in Kallithea, Athens. Over the years, the channel has operated multiple studios for news production, entertainment programmes, and drama series.

During its peak years, MEGA maintained dedicated drama production units and collaborated with independent production companies for scripted content. Many of its drama series were filmed on location across Greece, contributing to increased domestic television production standards.

== Audience and reception ==
Throughout the 1990s and 2000s, MEGA Channel consistently ranked among the most-watched television networks in Greece. Several of its drama series and entertainment programmes achieved long-running success and were frequently rebroadcast in later years.

Following its relaunch in 2020, the channel attracted significant attention due to the return of its news division and the revival of established programme brands. Viewer interest was particularly strong during major news events and the premieres of new scripted series.

== Digital presence ==
In addition to terrestrial broadcasting, MEGA Channel maintains an extensive digital presence. Its official website offers live streaming, programme catch-up services, and access to selected archival content. The channel is also active on social media platforms, where it promotes programming, shares news clips, and engages with viewers.

Archived MEGA productions continue to attract online viewership, particularly classic drama and comedy series from the 1990s and 2000s.

== Slogans and branding ==
Mega Channel (1989–2019)

- 1989–1999: Το Θέαμα Αρχίζει (The spectacle begins)
- 1989–1999: Το Μεγάλο Kανάλι στη μικρή οθόνη (The Big Channel on the small screen)
- 1999–2000: 10 Χρόνια Mega (10 Years Mega)
- 2000–2002: Ραντεβού στο Mega (Meet on Mega)
- 2002–2004: Όλοι Mega (Everyone Mega)
- 2004–2005: I love TV
- 2005–09/2009: Megalicious
- 09/2009–02/2010: Το Mega είναι 20 (Mega is 20)
- 02/2010–10/2014: Mega mou (My Mega)
- 10/2014–12/2019: Mega Mega

Unofficial slogans

- 07/2016–12/2019: Με την άδειά σας, συνεχίζουμε (With your permission, we continue)
- 11/2019–12/2019: 30 Χρόνια Mega (30 years Mega)

Mega Channel (2019–present)

- 11/2019–06/2021: Mega Mou (My Mega)
- 11/2019–06/2021: Mega όπως πάντα! (Mega as always!)
- 06/2021–present: Το Mega το καλό (The great Mega)

== Logo and copyrights ==
The original Mega logo consisted of 10 or 12 multicoloured lines with MEGA in the middle with the word channel located at the bottom.

Mega then launched a new logo in 1999 with the text 'MEGA', with 'ME' widened to the left and 'GA' widened to the right. This logo is still in use today.

The channel does regularly refresh its on-screen branding using the current seasons slogan. The channel also uses special idents at Christmas and Easter.

== Brand identity ==
MEGA Channel has maintained a consistent brand identity centred on its logo and typography. While on-screen presentation has evolved over time, the core logo design introduced in 1999 has remained largely unchanged.

Seasonal branding campaigns, anniversary idents, and thematic promotional packages have been used to mark milestones and special events throughout the channel’s history.

== MEGA Cosmos ==

MEGA Cosmos is the international service of Mega Channel that broadcasts the 'best of Mega' programming to Greeks abroad. It was first launched as Mega Channel Australia and then re-branded to Mega Cosmos using a common feed for Australia and North America.

In October 2022, MEGA Cosmos re-launched in Canada via Odyssey Television Network, available via Bell Fibe TV, Bell Satellite TV & Rogers Cable.

The original incarnation of MEGA Cosmos was available in

- Australia via UBI World TV and later via the Ellas TV platform (IPTV).
- USA via Dish Network and the Ellas TV platform (IPTV).

== International distribution ==
Beyond MEGA Cosmos, selected MEGA Channel programmes have been distributed internationally through licensing agreements with foreign broadcasters and digital platforms. Greek-language drama series in particular have been exported to markets with Greek-speaking audiences, as well as to international viewers through subtitled releases.

The channel’s programme library remains one of the largest privately held television archives in Greece.

== Ownership ==
=== Current ===
Alter Ego Media S.A. (100%)

- Evangelos Marinakis (75%)
- Rest shareholders (25%)

=== Former ===
Teletypos S.A. of Television Programmes (100%)

- Alter Ego Media S.A. (22,11%)
- Elenovo Ltd. - Anna Leonidou (19,63%)
- Pegasus Publications S.A. (13,09%)
- HSBC Private Bank (Suisse) S.A. (4,88%)
- GS Bank (4,80%)
- Moongold Investments Limited (3,32%)
- Baltazzi Investments Limited (3,26%)
- Goodlass Investments Limited (3,26%)
- Opalton Investments Limited (3,26%)
- Benbay Limited - Victoras Restis (3,19%)
- Saran Holdings S.A. SPF (2,81%)
- Prime Applications S.A. - Dimitris Kopelouzos (2,68%)
- Elkin Holdings S.A. (2,33%)
- Ascope Trading Limited (1,55%)
- EOK Equity Limited (1,32%)
- WAKO Investments S.A. (1,04%)
- Cyrenia Enterprises S.A. (1,02%)
- LAGAN Enterprises S.A. (1,02%)
- Tone Business S.A. (1,02%)
- Valens Trading S.A. (1,02%)
- Rest shareholders (3,39%)

== Participations ==
- Teletypos Cyprus Ltd: 100% subsidiary (main business mainly in the purchase and sale of programmes, know-how etc. in the markets of Cyprus and the Middle East)
- NETMED NV, Dutch cable television company: 12,5%

Former participations:

- Multichoice Hellas S.A., Greek cable television company: 42%, in 2003, 33% were transferred to Teletypos Cyprus but already in 2004 all 42% were exchanged with a 12.5% participation in the Dutch cable television company NETMED NV.

== See also ==
- Omega TV Cyprus
- Television in Greece
- List of Greek-language television channels
