= Edvard Ehlers =

Danish dermatologist (1863–1937)

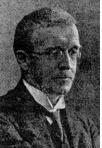
Edvard Ehlers

Edvard Laurits Ehlers (/ˈeɪlərz/, Danish pronunciation: [ˈe̝ðvɑːt ˈlɑwˀʁe̝ts ˈeːlɐs]; 26 March 1863 in Copenhagen – 7 May 1937) was a Danish dermatologist whose name was given to a group of rare genetic connective tissue disorders, known collectively as the Ehlers–Danlos syndromes (EDS), which were named, together after Henri-Alexandre Danlos from France, at the turn of the 20th century.

Ehlers grew up as the son of Copenhagen's mayor, and qualified in medicine in 1891. In the following years, he went into further studies in Berlin, Breslau, Vienna, and Paris. In Iceland, he studied the decline of leprosy and was rewarded for his studies with a prize from the National Leprosy Fund in London. In 1906, he was appointed chief of the dermatological polyclinic at the Frederiks Hospital in Copenhagen. From 1911 to his retirement in 1932, Ehlers was director at the municipal hospital of Copenhagen.

The Danish-born Australian artist Sussanne Morton, née Susanne Ehlers (born 1963), is his granddaughter.
