= Kolokytha =

Island in Greece

Native name: Κολοκύθα
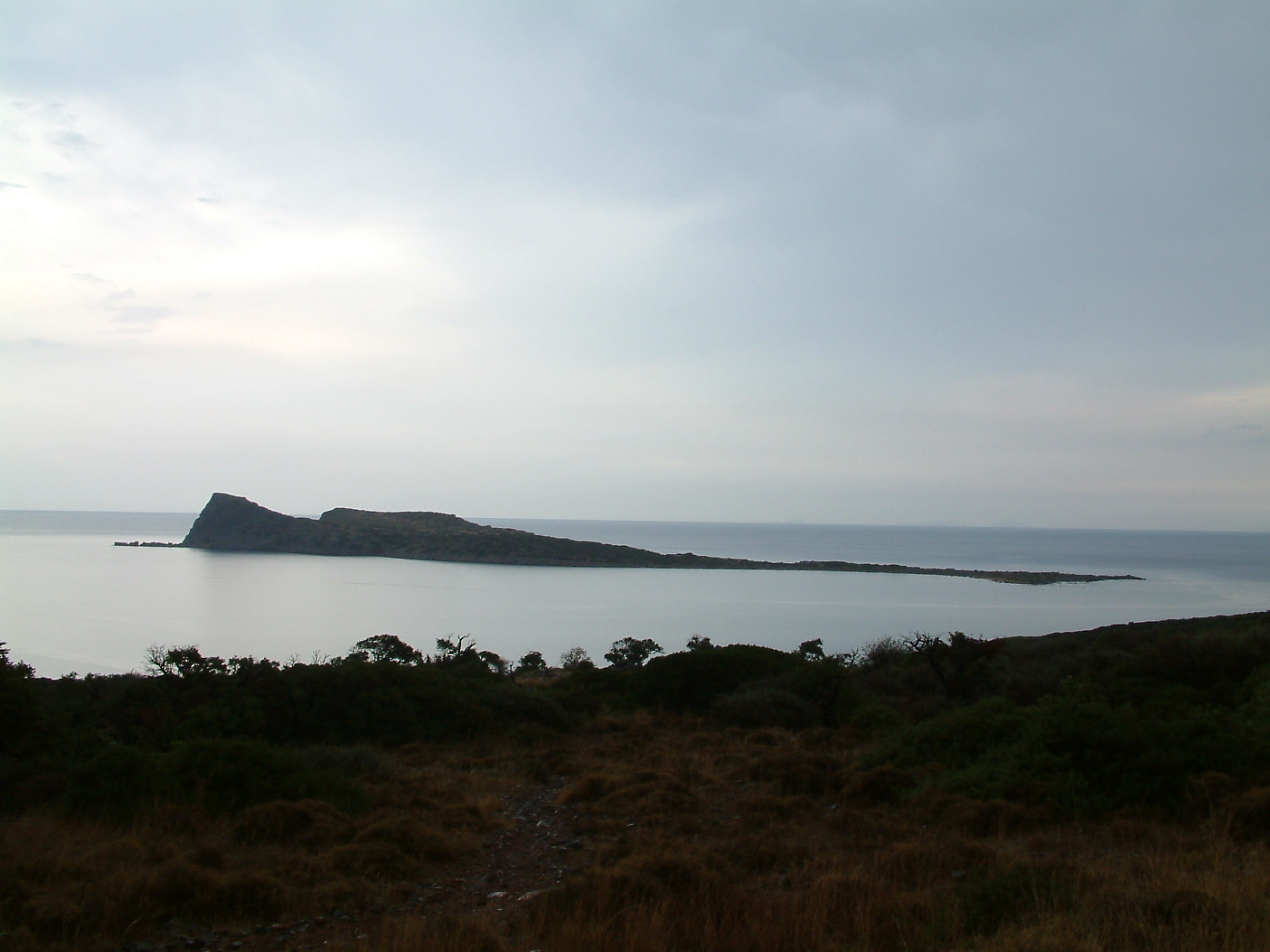
- The islet of Kolokytha.

- Location within Greece

Geography
- Coordinates: 35.264°N 25.760°E
- Archipelago: Cretan Islands
- Area: 0.144 km^{2} (0.056 sq mi)

Administration
- Greece
- Region: Crete
- Regional unit: Lasithi

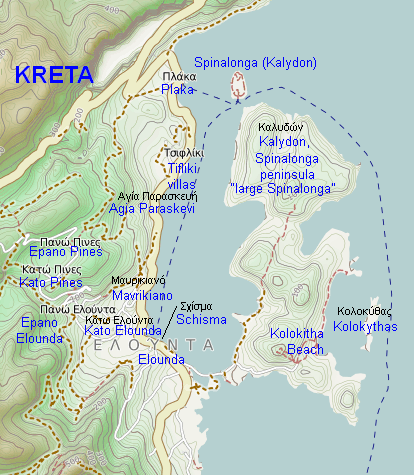
Map of Elounda, Spinalonga and surrounding areas.

Kolokytha (Greek: Κολοκύθα "pumpkin", also known as Κολοκυθιά, Kolokythia) is a Greek islet. It is part of municipality Agios Nikolaos of the regional unit Lasithi, eastern Crete. It is located approximately 850 meters east of the Spinalonga peninsula and forms a bay with it.

== See also ==
- List of islands of Greece
