= Victoria Hislop =

English author (born 1959)

Victoria Hislop FRSL
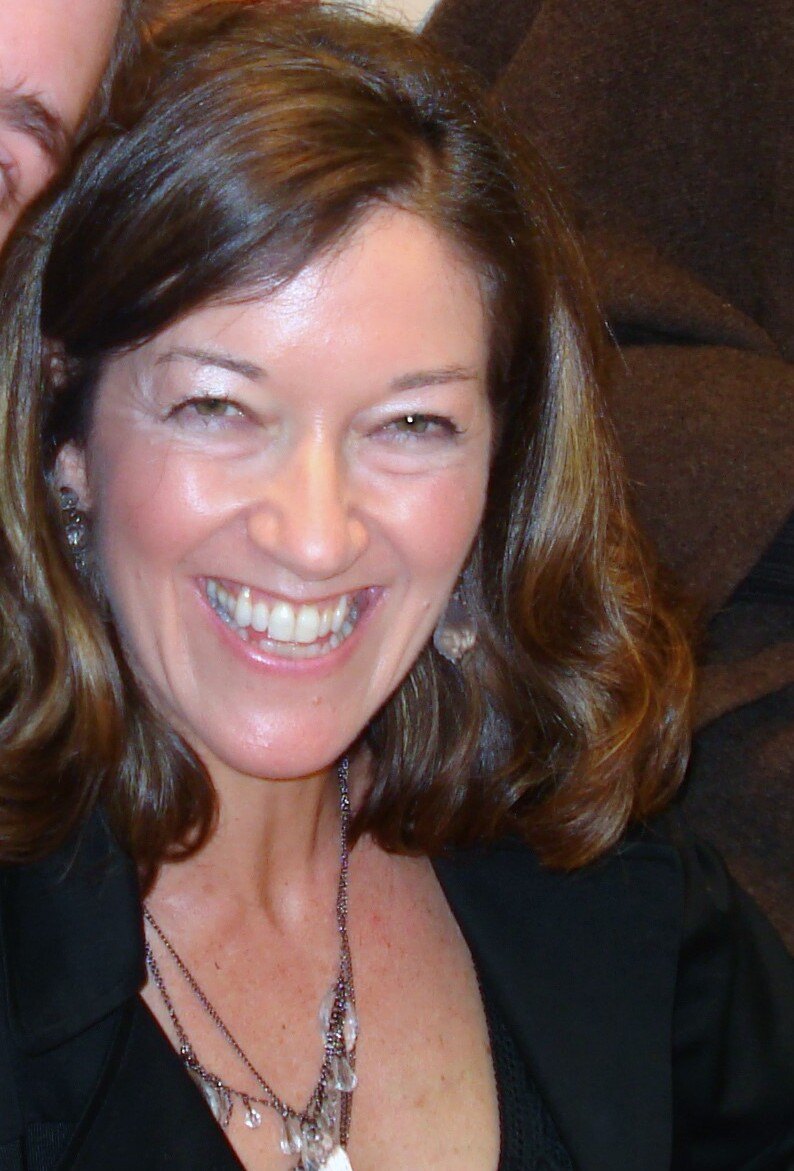
- Hislop in 2008
- Born: Victoria Hamson; 18 June 1959 (age 67); Bromley, Kent, England
- Citizenship: United Kingdom; Greece
- Education: Tonbridge Grammar School; University of Oxford (MA)
- Occupation: Novelist
- Spouse: Ian Hislop (m. 1988)
- Children: 2; including Will Hislop
- Writing career
- Notable works: The Island; To Nisi
- Website: www.victoriahislop.com

Victoria Hislop FRSL (née Hamson; born 18 June 1959) is an English author.

== Early life and education ==
Hislop was born on 18 June 1959, in Bromley, Kent, Hislop was raised in Tonbridge and educated at Tonbridge Grammar School, a state-funded grammar school. She studied English at the University of Oxford where she was an undergraduate student at St Hilda's College, Oxford.

== Career ==
Hislop worked in publishing and as a journalist before becoming an author. Her novel The Island was a number-one bestseller in Britain, its success in part the result of having been selected by the Richard & Judy Book Club for their 2006 Summer Reads. To Nisi (The Island) was filmed as a television show by the Mega Channel in Greece.

In 2009, she donated the short story "Aflame in Athens" to Oxfam's Ox-Tales project, four collections of British stories written by 38 authors. Her story was published in the "Fire" collection. Hislop has a particular affection for Greece. She visits the country often and has a second home on the island of Crete.

== Personal life ==
Victoria married Private Eye editor Ian Hislop on 16 April 1988 in Oxford; the couple have two children: Emily Helen (born 1990) and Will Hislop (born 1993). Hislop lived in London for more than twenty years, prior to setting up home in Sissinghurst, Kent. In 2012, the family acquired a townhouse in Chelsea.

In 2020, Hislop was granted honorary Greek citizenship for promoting the modern history of Greece and culture of Greece. The following year she was a contestant on Dancing with the Stars, the Greek version of Strictly Come Dancing.

== Bibliography ==
=== Novels ===
- The Island
- The Return (2008)
- The Thread (2011)
- The Sunrise (2014)
- Cartes Postales from Greece (2016)
- Those Who Are Loved (2019)
- One August Night (2020)
- Maria's Island (2021)
- The Figurine (2023)

=== Short stories ===
- One Cretan Evening and Other Stories (2011)
  - "One Cretan Evening" (2008)
  - "The Pine Tree" (2008)
  - "By The Fire" (2009)
  - "The Warmest Christmas Ever" (2007)
  - "Aflame in Athens" (2009)
- The Last Dance and Other Stories (2012; ten stories)

=== Non-fiction ===
- Sink or Swim: The Self-help Book for Men Who Never Read Them (2002) (with Duncan Goodhew)
- Fix Your Life – Now!: The Six Step Plan to Help You Fix Your Life (2012) (with Duncan Goodhew)

== Awards and honours ==
Hislop was elected a Fellow of the Royal Society of Literature (FRSL) in 2024. Hislop holds an Honorary Doctorate from the University of Sheffield, serves on the British Committee for the Reunification of the Parthenon Marbles with the Acropolis of Athens and was appointed Vice-President of the British School at Athens.
