= The Island (Hislop novel) =

2005 novel by Victoria Hislop

- Bookjacket for The Island
- Author: Victoria Hislop
- Language: English
- Publisher: Headline Review
- Publication date: 6 June 2005
- Publication place: United Kingdom
- Media type: Print (Hardback & Paperback)
- Pages: 473 pp
- ISBN: 978-0-7553-0950-4
- OCLC: 57750452

The Island is a historical novel written by Victoria Hislop. It won several awards including Newcomer of the Year at the 2007 British Book Awards. The book was nominated for the Book of the Year award at the same event.

== Plot ==
The novel is set on the island of Spinalonga, off the coast of Crete, and on the village of Plaka which lies within swimming distance across the bay from it. The Island tells the story of Alexis Fielding, a 25-year-old on the cusp of a life-changing decision. Alexis knows little or nothing about her family's past and has always resented her mother for refusing to discuss it. She knows only that her mother, Sofia, grew up in Plaka, a small Cretan village, before moving to London.

Making her first visit to Crete to see the village where her mother was born, Alexis discovers that the village of Plaka faces the small, now deserted island of Spinalonga. Alexis is shocked and surprised to learn the deserted island was Greece's leper colony for much of the 20th century. It is here that Alexis meets an old friend of her mother's, Fotini. The older woman is prepared to tell her for the first time the whole tragic story of her family.

What Fotini tells Alexis is shocking and tragic, it is the story which Sofia has spent her life concealing: the story of Eleni, her grandmother, and of a family torn apart by tragedy, war and passion. Eleni has two children, called Maria and Anna with her husband Georgio. She discovers how intimately she is connected with the island and with the horror and pity of the leper colony which was once there, and learns too that the secrets of the past have the power to change the future.

== TV adaptation ==
Mega Channel Greece produced a 26-episode television series called To Nisi (The Island), based on the book which premiered on 11 October 2010. It was filmed from December 2009 on location on Crete.
