= Magpie Murders (TV series) =

2022 British series

- Genre: Murder mystery
- Created by: Anthony Horowitz
- Based on: Magpie Murders by Anthony Horowitz
- Written by: Anthony Horowitz
- Directed by: Peter Cattaneo
- Starring: Lesley Manville; Timothy McMullan; Conleth Hill
- Theme music composer: Murray Gold
- Countries of origin: United Kingdom; United States
- Original language: English
- No. of episodes: 6

Production
- Executive producers: Suzanne Simpson; Lesley Manville; Peter Cattaneo; Suzanne McAuley; Jill Green; Anthony Horowitz
- Producer: Suzanne McAuley
- Cinematography: Anna Valdez Hanks
- Editors: Nigel Bunyan; Jamie Pearson
- Production companies: BBC Studios; Eleventh Hour Films; Masterpiece

Original release
- Network: BritBox (United Kingdom)
- Release: 10 February 2022
- Network: PBS (United States)
- Release: 16 October – 13 November 2022

Related
- Moonflower Murders; Marble Hall Murders

Magpie Murders is a 2022 drama series that adapts the Anthony Horowitz novel of the same name. The series stars Lesley Manville and Tim McMullan as Susan Ryeland and Atticus Pünd, respectively.

The second book in the Susan Ryeland series, Moonflower Murders, was also adapted into a series and was broadcast in 2024. The numerous through-line plot elements between the two series made it into a de facto season two. An adaptation of the third and final entry in the series, Marble Hall Murders, premiered in 2026.

== Synopsis ==
While editing the latest and final entry in the wildly popular Atticus Pünd series, editor Susan Ryeland discovers that the last chapter is missing and that the author, Alan Conway, is dead. The death is reported as a suicide; however, during her searches for the final chapter, Susan begins to realize that Conway based several of his characters on the people around him - and that all of them have ample reason to despise his very existence.

== Cast ==
- Lesley Manville as Susan Ryeland
- Tim McMullan as Atticus Pünd
- Conleth Hill as Alan Conway
- Michael Maloney as Charles Clover
- Alexandros Logothetis as Andreas Patakis
- Daniel Mays as Locke / Chubb
- Claire Rushbrook as Katie Williams
- Jude Hill as Sam Blakiston
- Matthew Beard as James Taylor / James Fraser
- Pippa Haywood as Claire Jenkins / Clarissa Pye
- Ian Lloyd Anderson as Brent
- Karen Westwood as Mary Blakiston
- Dorothy Atkinson as Lady Frances Pye
- Lorcan Cranitch as Max Ryeland / Sir Magnus Pye
- Danielle Ryan as Alice
- Harry Lawtey as Robert Blakiston
- Chu Omambala as Rev. Robeson / Rev. Osborne
- Karl Collins as Jack White / Jack Whiteley
- Sutara Gayle as Gemma Whiteley
- Sanjeev Kohli as Sajid Khan / Dr. Kamal
- Paul Tylak as Lee Jaffery
- Nathan Clarke as Freddy Conway / Frederick Pye
- Kate Gilmore as Jemima
- Nathalie Armin as Melissa Conway

== Production ==
Plans to adapt the novel were first announced in July 2020. Deadline announced that PBS's Masterpiece would adapt the novel into a six-part drama series, which would be aired in the US and on BritBox in the UK. Horowitz was brought on to pen the script and Masterpiece was to produce it along with Jill Green and Eleventh Hour Films. Peter Cattaneo served as director.

Actress Lesley Manville was brought on to portray Susan Ryeland, while Tim McMullan was to play Atticus Pünd. Timothy Spall was originally slated to portray the character, but withdrew due to scheduling issues. Other actors brought into the production include Daniel Mays as the local police detective, Alexandros Logothetis as Susan's lover and Claire Rushbrook as her sister. Jude Hill and Matthew Beard were also part of the series' cast.

The role of author Alan Conway was played by Conleth Hill. Other members of the cast included Pippa Haywood, Michael Maloney, Ian Lloyd Anderson, Karen Westwood, Dorothy Atkinson, Lorcan Cranitch, Danielle Ryan, Harry Lawtey, Nia Deacon, Chu Omambala, Karl Collins, Sutara Gayle, Sanjeev Kohli, Paul Tylak, David Herlihy, Nathan Clarke, San Shella, Kate Gilmore and Beverley Longhurst.

The television series was filmed in 2021. Some exteriors were shot in London, and extensive shooting was completed in Suffolk, where much of the story takes place; the production spent more than three weeks in the village of Kersey, where the Bell Inn became The Queen’s Arms. Filming also took place in and around Dublin, with Dublin City University properties used for some scenes. Other filming took place in Bloomsbury in County Meath.

== Episodes ==
No.	Title	Directed by	Written by	U.K. airdate	U.S. airdate
1	"Episode 1"	Peter Cattaneo	Anthony Horowitz	10 February 2022	16 October 2022
2	"Episode 2"	Peter Cattaneo	Anthony Horowitz	10 February 2022	23 October 2022
3	"Episode 3"	Peter Cattaneo	Anthony Horowitz	10 February 2022	30 October 2022
4	"Episode 4"	Peter Cattaneo	Anthony Horowitz	10 February 2022	6 November 2022
5	"Episode 5"	Peter Cattaneo	Anthony Horowitz	10 February 2022	13 November 2022
6	"Episode 6"	Peter Cattaneo	Anthony Horowitz	10 February 2022	20 November 2022

== Broadcast ==
On BritBox in the UK, the series began streaming on 10 February 2022; in North America, the PBS series premiered on 16 October 2022.

== Reception ==
Magpie Murders holds a rating of 100% on review aggregate Rotten Tomatoes, based on 16 reviews, with an average rating of 8 out of 10.
