= Marble Hall Murders =

2025 book

- Author: Anthony Horowitz
- Audio read by: Lesley Manville; Tim McMullan
- Language: English
- Series: Susan Ryeland
- Genre: Mystery
- Publisher: Century (UK), HarperCollins (US)
- Publication date: 2025
- Media type: Print, ebook, audiobook
- Preceded by: Moonflower Murders

Marble Hall Murders is a 2025 mystery novel and the third book in the Susan Ryeland series, following the 2020 release of Moonflower Murders. Written by British author Anthony Horowitz, the entry follows Susan Ryeland who finds herself once again involved in a suspicious death. Although listed as the final entry in the series, Horowitz has expressed interest in continuing the series.

A miniseries adaptation was produced with the BBC, before being released in 2026.

== Synopsis ==
Despite attempts to make her life in Greece and relationship with Andreas work, Susan Ryeland has found herself back in England working as a freelance editor with Causton Books. Her new boss, Michael, has tasked her with editing the first entry in the new continuation of the Atticus Pünd series, which is being written by Eliot Crace, grandson of the late, beloved children's author Miriam Crace. The hope is that Susan will be able to help Eliot capture some of the magic of Alan Conway's original series, as his previous two novels sold poorly.

Susan receives the opening chapters of the novel, Pünd’s Last Case. In the novel, Atticus Pünd has retired as a detective after receiving a terminal diagnosis of a brain tumour. He's brought back into the field at the behest of Margaret Chalfont, a dying former associate who has grown afraid of her husband Elmer. She then leaves for a chateau in France, but by the time Atticus arrives he discovers that Margaret has died. His resulting investigation finds several clues that point towards Elmer being the murderer.

While investigating Eliot's family, Susan learns that Miriam was a manipulative, terrible human being who mistreated everyone around her. The Crace family willingly kept the abuse secret to maintain access to her wealth. Miriam's adopted son Frederick wishes to continue keeping it a secret so they can continue making money off Miriam's work. Betrayal within the family is discovered, as Eliot's wife Gillian has been having an affair with Eliot's brother Roland, resulting in a pregnancy. At a memorial dinner for Miriam, Eliot announces that his grandmother was murdered twenty years prior and that the killer's identity has been hidden in his latest book. Eliot then fires Susan and leaves the party, after which he is killed in a hit-and-run. Susan is framed for the murder by Elaine, the wife of Charles, the editor turned murderer of Alan Conway. The investigating detective, Ian Blakeney, does not believe that Susan is responsible. However, this does not stop Elaine and Charles' efforts.

With Ian's help, Susan finds additional chapters and notes that Eliot wrote for Pünd's Last Case. Margaret's stepson, Robert Waysmith, is revealed as the killer. His name is an anagram for "it was my brother". Eliot wrote Robert as a stand-in for Roland, whom he believed murdered Miriam. This is shown to not be the case, as the true killer of Miriam is Frederick, who was born out of an affair with her former chauffeur, Bruno. Frederick murdered Miriam out of revenge, as Miriam had kept his parentage a secret, and he had only learned of his father after the man's death. He killed Eliot out of fear that the book would reveal his crime.

Susan confronts Elaine over her attempts to frame her for Eliot's death. Elaine tries to murder Susan, but is arrested by Ian. Susan launches her own publishing company and purchases the rights for Pünd's Last Case, which is finished by Ian under a pseudonym. Susan also publishes a biography of Miriam that reveals the woman's true, wicked personality. Sales of Miriam's work drop and lucrative adaptation deals are cancelled. The book ends with Susan and Ian becoming a couple.

== Development ==
Horowitz had initially intended for the first entry in the series, Magpie Murders, to be a standalone novel. He wrote the second entry after his wife, Jill Green, suggested that a second entry would make it easier to raise funding for a TV series adaptation of The Magpie Murders. Horowitz had then not intended to write a third entry, but chose to continue for one more entry after Lesley Manville told him that she would like to return for a third series. He has expressed interest in a fourth entry, which he has tentatively titled Mile End Murders.

== Release ==
Marble Hall Murders was first published in hardback and ebook in the United Kingdom on 10 April 2025 through Century, and in the United States on 13 May 2025 through HarperCollins. An audiobook adaptation narrated by Lesley Manville and Tim McMullan was released simultaneously in the United Kingdom and United States through Penguin Audio and Harper Audio, respectively.

== Reception ==
Upon its release, Marble Hall Murders received reviews from The Wall Street Journal and Richmond Times-Dispatch, as well as BookPage.

== Adaptation ==
Adaptation rights to the series were acquired by the BBC, which announced its intent to create a third series that would have Lesley Manville and Tim McMullan reprising their roles as Susan Ryeland and Atticus Pünd. The series will be produced by Eleventh Hour Films in association with Salt Films. Jill Green will serve as executive producer. In June 2025 Horowitz confirmed that filming was halfway completed and that Rebecca Gatwald had returned as director.
