= Marble Hall Murders (TV series) =

British television series

- Genre: Murder mystery
- Created by: Anthony Horowitz
- Based on: Marble Hall Murders by Anthony Horowitz
- Written by: Anthony Horowitz
- Directed by: Rebecca Gatward
- Starring: Lesley Manville; Timothy McMullan
- Composer: Murray Gold
- Countries of origin: United Kingdom; United States
- Original language: English
- No. of episodes: 6

Production
- Executive producers: Suzanne Simpson; Lesley Manville; Rebecca Gatward; Suzanne McAuley; Jill Green; Anthony Horowitz
- Producer: Suzanne McAuley
- Cinematography: Peter Robertson
- Editor: Catherine Creed
- Production companies: BBC Studios; Salt Films; PBS Masterpiece; Eleventh Hour Films

Original release
- Network: PBS (United States)
- Release: 6 September – 11 October 2026
- Network: BBC One (United Kingdom)
- Release: 26 September – 31 October 2026

Related
- Magpie Murders; Moonflower Murders

Marble Hall Murders is a murder mystery television series that is an adaptation of the novel of the same name by British author Anthony Horowitz and the third novel in the Susan Ryeland series. It premiered on PBS on 6 September 2026, and on BBC One on 26 September 2026.

== Premise ==
Susan Ryeland begins to investigate a decades-old death of a once popular author of children's books.

== Cast and characters ==
- Lesley Manville as Susan Ryeland
- Tim McMullan as Atticus Pünd
- Patricia Hodge as Miriam Crace / Lady Margaret Chalfont
- Mark Bonnar as Edward Crace / Elmer Waysmith
- Jamie Blackley as Eliot Crace
- Daniel Cerqueira as Dr. Julian Lambert / Hector Lambrose
- Harry Lloyd as Roland Crace / Robert Waysmith
- Rupert Penry-Jones as Jonathan Crace / Jeffrey Chalfont
- Anneika Rose as Emma Wardlaw
- Danny Sapani as Ian Blakeney
- Zubin Varla as Frederick Turner / Achilles Vassilikos
- Katie Clarkson-Hill as Gillian Crace
- Yasmine Al Massri as Leila Crace / Lola Chalfont
- Phoenix Laroche as young Eliot Crace / Cedric Chalfont
- Nia Brown as young Julia Crace
- Luke Lambert as young Roland Crace
- Claire Rushbrook as Katie Williams
- Jorden Myrie as Matthew Flynn
- Laura Rogers as Julia Crace / Judith Lyttleton
- Richard Goulding as Harry Lyttleton
- Martha Lambiri as Maria Kapodistria
- Manolis Emmanouel as Kristos
- Alexis Georgoulis as Michalis
- Ian Porter as Harrison Carter
- Lydia Fleming as Sofia Androulakis
- Amelia Bullmore as Elaine Clover
- Michael Maloney as Charles Clover
- Dean Panter as Sam

== Production ==
In January 2025, the series was ordered by BBC One and PBS, with Lesley Manville and Tim McMullan reprising their roles from 2024's Moonflower Murders. The series is adapted by Anthony Horowitz from his third and final Susan Ryeland novel of the same name, with Jill Green as executive producer. Filming locations include Corfu and London. Speaking in June 2025, Horowitz stated that filming on the second series was underway with Rebecca Gatwald as director.

First-look images from filming were released in April 2026, with additional cast members for the series including Mark Bonnar, Patricia Hodge, Rupert Penry-Jones, Anneika Rose and Harry Lloyd.

== Episodes ==
No.	Title	Directed by	Written by	U.K. airdate	U.S. airdate
1	"Episode 1"	Rebecca Gatward	Anthony Horowitz	26 September 2026	6 September 2026
2	"Episode 2"	Rebecca Gatward	Anthony Horowitz	3 October 2026	13 September 2026
3	"Episode 3"	Rebecca Gatward	Anthony Horowitz	10 October 2026	20 September 2026
4	"Episode 4"	Rebecca Gatward	Anthony Horowitz	17 October 2026	27 September 2026
5	"Episode 5"	Rebecca Gatward	Anthony Horowitz	24 October 2026	4 October 2026
6	"Episode 6"	Rebecca Gatward	Anthony Horowitz	31 October 2026	11 October 2026

== Broadcast ==
It premiered on PBS in the United States on 6 September 2026. In the United Kingdom the series premiered on BBC One and BBC iPlayer on 26 September.

== Reception ==
The Times described the series as a "joyous and enthusiastic celebration of classic British crime fiction" with "twisty, multilayered, multi-timelined set of mysteries that revel in just about every tradition, trope, and custom". The Guardian wrote: "The amateur sleuth is a well-worn archetype but Lesley Manville inhabits it more persuasively than most". The Daily Telegraph gave a less positive review, stating: "It's a clever work of metafiction, and while that might have made for a satisfying book, in a TV series it’s hard work."

== See also ==
- Magpie Murders (TV series), released 2022
- Moonflower Murders (TV series), released 2024
