= Kate Gilmore =

Kate Gilmore may refer to:

- Kate Gilmore (UN official), Deputy High Commissioner for Human Rights of the United Nations
- Kate Gilmore (artist) (born 1975), fine artist
- Kate Gilmore (actress), Irish stage and television actress
