= Emily Young (film director) =

British film director

Emily Young (born 1970) is a British film director and screenwriter who teaches screenwriting and directing at the London Film School.

== Early life ==
Young was born in Islington, London, the daughter of Helen Young (née Mason) and Hugo Young. Both her parents were journalists and her mother was also a children's book author.

== Education ==
Young studied English Literature at the University of Edinburgh where she was awarded a First Class MA degree. She then learned Polish and trained as a film director at the Polish National Film School in Łódź. She was awarded a residency in Paris by the Cannes Film Festival in 2000 to develop a feature film of the memoir Once in a House on Fire by Andrea Ashworth.

== Career ==
After graduating from the Polish National Film School in Łódź, Young won the Cinéfondation prize at the 1999 Cannes Film Festival for her graduation film, Second Hand (1999). Her first feature film, Kiss of Life (2003) was awarded the Carl Forman prize for best debut film at the 57th British Academy Film Awards. Young then went on to direct Veronika Decides to Die (2009). Set in New York City, the film is based on the novel Veronika Decides to Die written by Paulo Coelho and stars Sarah Michelle Gellar and David Thewlis. Young is currently developing an adaptation of the novel White by Marie Darrieussecq in collaboration with Film Four.

== Filmography ==
- Ziemia na górze (1996)
- Second Hand (1999)
- Kiss of Life (2003)
- Veronika Decides to Die (2009)

== Awards and nominations ==
| Year | Festival | Award | Work | Result |
|---|---|---|---|---|
| 1999 | Cannes Film Festival | Cinéfondation 1st Prize | Second Hand | Won |
| 2003 | Copenhagen International Film Festival | Golden Swan Award | Kiss of Life | Nominated |
| 2003 | Dinard Festival of British Cinema | Golden Hitchcock Award | Kiss of Life | Nominated |
| 2004 | BAFTA Awards | Carl Foreman Award for Best Newcomer | Kiss of Life | Won |
| 2004 | British Independent Film Awards | Douglas Hiscox Award | Kiss of Life | Nominated |
