= Veronika Decides to Die (film) =

- Directed by: Emily Young
- Screenplay by: Roberta Hanley; Larry Gross
- Based on: Veronika Decides to Die by Paulo Coelho
- Produced by: Chris Hanley; Sriram Das; Jonathan Bross
- Starring: Sarah Michelle Gellar; Jonathan Tucker; Erika Christensen; Florencia Lozano; Melissa Leo; David Thewlis
- Cinematography: Seamus Tierney
- Edited by: Úna Ní Dhonghaíle
- Music by: Murray Gold
- Production companies: Future Films; Velvet Octopus; Das Films; Muse Productions; Velvet Steamroller Entertainment; PalmStar Entertainment
- Distributed by: Entertainment One Films
- Release dates: August 21, 2009 (Brazil); January 20, 2015 (United States)
- Running time: 103 minutes
- Country: United States
- Language: English
- Box office: $1.7 million (foreign)

Veronika Decides to Die is a 2009 American psychological drama film directed by Emily Young from a screenplay by Roberta Hanley and Larry Gross, based on the 1998 novel of the same name by Paulo Coelho. It stars Sarah Michelle Gellar in the title role, with Jonathan Tucker, Florencia Lozano, Melissa Leo, David Thewlis, and Erika Christensen appearing as supporting characters. While the novel originally takes place in Ljubljana, Slovenia, the film is set in New York City.

== Plot ==
Despite a seemingly successful life, 30-something Veronika Deklava is depressed and cannot find meaning in her existence. Intending suicide, she takes an overdose, blaming her attempt on the failure of the world to recognize what is "real". She wakes inside an exclusive and expensive mental asylum only to learn that the overdose has left her prone to an aneurysm that will kill her in a matter of weeks.

At first, Veronika wants only to accelerate the process, and even a visit by her adoptive parents fails to rekindle her will to live. Her parents express their love for her, and that while they are prepared to spend their dwindling resources to get her what help they can, they do not truly understand her. Not knowing her death is imminent, they discouraged her from accepting a full musical scholarship at Juilliard and insist that she gets a degree that could earn her a living. They appear oblivious to her despair at their constraints.

In spite of herself and disappointment with her materialistic life, Veronika finds renewed purpose through playing the asylum's piano and connecting with the schizophrenic Edward. In addition to recovering a will to live, Veronika helps bring Edward out of his catatonic state. The pair soon escape, observed by Dr. Blake who does not send for anyone to bring them back. Their determination is to enjoy Veronika's final days as a couple.

What Veronika doesn't know, is that her aneurysm is the invention of her psychiatrist Dr. Blake, who is testing his theory that convincing Veronika she only has weeks to live will cure her desire to end her life. He explains his treatment through letter to his estranged wife, a colleague from the asylum. As long as Veronika does not know the truth, he theorizes, she will consider each day as if it might be her last and thus treasure it. This is true, Dr Blake argues, as nobody knows when their end will come.

When Veronika drifts off one morning on a bench at sunrise, Edward believes he has lost her. His grief is replaced by joy when she wakes. Celebrating what they believe might be one more day, the pair embrace and walk happily on the beach in the morning light, holding hands and laughing.

== Cast ==
- Sarah Michelle Gellar as Veronika Deklava
- Jonathan Tucker as Edward
- Erika Christensen as Claire
- Florencia Lozano as Dr. Thompson
- Melissa Leo as Mari
- David Thewlis as Dr. Blake
- Adrian Martinez as male nurse #1

== Production ==
Both Lindsay Lohan and Kate Bosworth were previously attached to the project. Gellar was ultimately cast in the title role.

Gillian Anderson and Katherine Fugate had tried to produce a version of this film but lost out on the bid to produce it. Eventually, the novel was adapted for film by Muse Productions, Das Films, and Velvet Steamroller Entertainment.

Shooting for the film began on May 12, 2008, in New York City and concluded on June 21.

== Release ==
Veronika Decides to Die had a special screening in Brazil on August 7, 2009, followed by an August 21 release. The film was released in Poland and Sweden in October 2009, in South Korea on November 19, 2009, in Lithuania on April 23, 2010, in Argentina on July 1, 2010, and in Mexico and Germany in September 2010. In Australia, it was released on a region-free PAL DVD. It was never officially released in the United Kingdom.

In the United States, the film was released by Entertainment One Films in select theaters and on VOD on January 20, 2015, and on DVD on March 17, 2015. The film was made available on Netflix the same year.
