= Hoodwinked Too! Hood vs. Evil (soundtrack) =

2011 soundtrack albums

Hoodwinked Too! Hood vs. Evil (Original Motion Picture Soundtrack)

Soundtrack album by Various artists
- Released: April 26, 2011
- Genre: Soundtrack
- Length: 27:06
- Label: Lakeshore Records
- Producer: Various artists

Hoodwinked Too! Hood vs. Evil (Original Motion Picture Soundtrack) is the film's soundtrack album for the film of the same name. Two soundtrack albums were released for Hoodwinked Too!. The former featured eleven original songs performed by the cast members and singers, which released through Lakeshore Records on April 26, 2011. The latter featured the original score composed by Murray Gold, Tom Keane and Dean Landon, which was also distributed by the same label and released on May 17.

== Soundtrack ==
Country musician Dan Myers had performed three original songs for the film. His tune for "Look Out Shorty!" was selected for a sample when the producers wanted a whimsical, hip-hop theme styled tune done in a big-band jazz style, and felt this sounded to be the perfect fit. The song was performed by Wayne Newton whose woice was considered to be "thrilling". Myers recalled that he spent three nights to write and record the track as his agent Lauren McCarthy wanted a song which was about short people but does not namecall them and would be suited to play in a swing club. He was assisted by his friends from the Chicago jazz community to help him make the demo in a hurry. Eventually, he was offered to write two more songs, including "Little Squirrel (Forage for Your Love)" which the director considered it to be a funny distraction that he tried during the film. The song was first heard as an instrumental and a lyrical version accompanies the film during the end credits. Hayden Panettiere performed the song "I Can Do It Alone".

=== Reception ===
William Ruhlmann of AllMusic gave the film's soundtrack album three out of five stars, adding that the soundtrack was predominantly dominated by Myers, which was considered to be a roadkill. Justin Chang of Variety wrote "Musical choices are as unsubtle as the numerous gags in which tangential characters are squashed by falling objects or trampled underfoot." Review Graveyard wrote "There are no surprises here - just a collection of formulaic pop songs which are inoffensive and easy on the ears."

=== Track listing ===
No.	Title	Length
1.	"You Know It" (performed by Lavay Cole and Andrea Remanda)	2:23
2.	"I Can Do It Alone" (performed by Hayden Panettiere)	3:25
3.	"Big City" (performed by Dan Myers)	2:18
4.	"Living In A Fairy Tale (With You)" (performed by Wayne Newton)	0:51
5.	"Look Out Shorty!" (performed by Wayne Newton)	1:24
6.	"Little Squirrel (Forage For Your Love)" (performed by Dan Myers)	3:55
7.	"Inseparable" (performed by Hayden Panettiere)	4:02
8.	"Kung Fu Fighting" (performed by Theo Bleckmann)	0:56
9.	"Perfect Two" (performed by Ceej)	3:14
10.	"Living In A Fairy Tale (With You)" (performed by Dan Myers)	2:02
11.	"Lethal Aneurysm" (performed by Michael Kincart)	2:36
Total length:		27:06

== Score ==
Hoodwinked Too! Hood vs. Evil (Original Motion Picture Score)

Film score by Murray Gold, Tom Keane and Dean Landon
- Released: May 17, 2011
- Venues: Hampstead, London, England, UK
- Studio: Air Lyndhurst Studios
- Genre: Film score
- Length: 46:11
- Label: Lakeshore Records
- Producers: Murray Gold; Tom Keane; Dean Landon

Hoodwinked chronology
Hoodwinked Too! Hood vs. Evil (Original Motion Picture Soundtrack) (2011)	Hoodwinked Too! Hood vs. Evil (Original Motion Picture Score) (2011)

Hoodwinked Too! Hood vs. Evil (Original Motion Picture Score) is the film's score album, featuring Murray Gold, Tom Keane and Dean Landon's musical score with some additional music by Christopher Tin. It was recorded at Air Lyndhurst Studios (in the London area of Hampstead) and was released on May 17, 2011 by Lakeshore Records.

=== Reception ===
William Ruhlmann of AllMusic gave the film's score album three out of five stars, saying "The music is all over the lot, but that may be only to say that it fits in with the song score and the hellzappopin nature of the movie itself." Ben Simon of Animated Views wrote "there's often too much going on in the soundtrack department to try and appreciate it all, not least Murray Gold's repetitive Incredibles-knock off music score, which itself is buried under the non-stop talking".

=== Track listing ===
All music is composed by Murray Gold, Tom Keane and Dean Landon.

No.	Title	Length
1.	"Happily Ever Before"	1:13
2.	"Operation Free The Children"	4:08
3.	"Out Of Reach"	0:47
4.	"Red"	1:59
5.	"Sister Hoods"	2:54
6.	"HEA"	1:27
7.	"Hoodwinked Hop"	0:40
8.	"A Hasty Exit"	1:09
9.	"A Long Standing Feud"	2:27
10.	"The Amazing Granny Puckett"	0:38
11.	"How It All Started"	2:15
12.	"On The Trail Of Evil"	2:02
13.	"Survive the Night"	0:39
14.	"Three Pigs"	1:43
15.	"A Pitiful Fight"	0:51
16.	"The Song Of Kirk"	1:16
17.	"The Unstoppable Hoods"	0:57
18.	"A Dastardly Growth Spurt"	1:38
19.	"Red Down"	4:21
20.	"Legs"	1:50
21.	"Go Red!"	0:30
22.	"A Gigantic Problem"	1:29
23.	"In Training"	2:14
24.	"All In The Balance"	2:01
25.	"Swaggering Through The City"	1:16
26.	"Fight The Fight, Fighters"	0:59
27.	"Until Next Time"	2:38
28.	"Hoodwinked Logo"	0:10
Total length:		46:11
