= Murray Gold =

English composer and dramatist (born 1969)

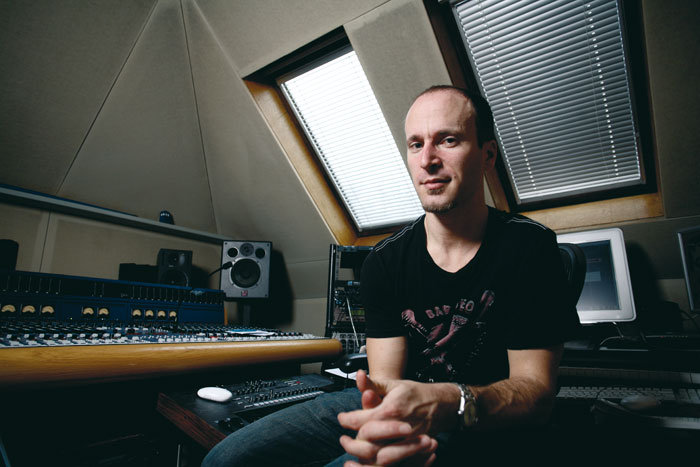
- Gold in his London studio in 2007

Background information
- Born: Murray Jonathan Gold; 28 February 1969 (age 57); Portsmouth, Hampshire, England
- Occupation: Composer
- Years active: 1994–present
- Label: Silva Screen

Murray Jonathan Gold (born 28 February 1969) is an English composer for stage, film, and television and a dramatist for both theatre and radio. He is best known as the musical director and composer of the music of Doctor Who from 2005 to 2017 and 2023 to 2025. Gold's other television work includes Queer as Folk, Last Tango in Halifax and Gentleman Jack. He has been nominated for five BAFTAs.

== Early life ==
Born in Portsmouth, Hampshire to a Jewish family, Gold initially pursued drama as a vocation, while writing and playing music as a hobby, but switched to music when he became musical director for the University of Cambridge's Footlights society. He went to Corpus Christi College and studied history.

== Television ==
Gold has been nominated for a BAFTA five times in the category Best Original Television Music, for Vanity Fair (1999), Queer as Folk (2000), Casanova (2006) and twice for Doctor Who (2009 and 2014). His score for the BAFTA winning film Kiss of Life was awarded the 'Mozart Prize of the 7th Art' by a French jury at Aubagne in 2003. He has also been nominated four times by the Royal Television Society in categories relating to music for television.

He has worked with Russell T Davies, the lead writer and executive producer of Doctor Who, many times in the past on projects such as Casanova (starring David Tennant), The Second Coming (starring Christopher Eccleston) and Queer as Folk 1 & 2. He has also provided the incidental music for the 2000s version of Randall & Hopkirk (Deceased) alongside James Bond composer David Arnold, who provided the theme tune.

He wrote the theme tune for the Channel 4 series Shameless and scored the period drama The Devil's Whore. More recently Gold scored another David Tennant series, in BBC One's Single Father. In this, Gold opted for a more popular music style ensemble rather than writing for orchestra.

Murray Gold composed the musical score for the drama series Last Tango in Halifax which ran from 2012 to 2020. In 2014, Gold scored the BBC series The Musketeers.

In 2019, Gold reunited with Russell T Davies for his series Years and Years, a drama based around a family and how the political, cultural and technological changes around the world affected them. He also composed the music for the BBC and HBO series Gentleman Jack.

In 2021, Gold reunited again with Russell T Davies for his series It’s A Sin, a drama focused on the 1980s AIDS Crisis. The show would go on to win numerous awards.

Gold scored the music for Magpie Murders (2022) and Moonflower Murders (2024), mystery series adapted by Anthony Horowitz from his own eponymously named novels.

=== Doctor Who and related series ===
From 2005 to 2017 and since 2023, Gold served as musical director of science fiction drama Doctor Who for the BBC under executive producers Russell T Davies (2005–2010; 2023–2025) and Steven Moffat (2010–2017). In this capacity, he created a new arrangement of the show's theme (originally composed by Ron Grainer and Delia Derbyshire) and also composed the show's incidental music. Silva Screen released a compilation of Gold's Doctor Who incidental music from the first and second series, entitled Doctor Who: Original Television Soundtrack, on 11 December 2006. A second CD, Doctor Who: Original Television Soundtrack – Series 3, was released on 5 November 2007 and a third, Doctor Who: Original Television Soundtrack – Series 4, was released in November 2008. He has also been seen very briefly in the show itself, making a cameo appearance (and wearing a false moustache) in the 2007 Christmas special "Voyage of the Damned". He appeared again as a pianist in the series 14 episode "The Devil's Chord". He was credited as playing himself. Also, music from the 2008–2010 specials was released on 4 October 2010, entitled Doctor Who: Original Television Soundtrack – Series 4: The Specials, and on 8 November music from Series 5, entitled Doctor Who: Original Television Soundtrack – Series 5, was released.

Gold's initial arrangement of the Doctor Who theme did not include the "middle eight" portion originally used in the theme, although he later reinstated it for a rearrangement of the theme introduced in the series' 2005 Christmas episode and subsequently used in the 2006 series of the programme. Gold has created many themes to be associated with various elements of the show, creating two themes for the Doctor ("The Doctor's Theme" and "The Doctor Forever"), Rose Tyler, Martha Jones, Donna Noble, Gallifrey, the Master, Astrid Peth, the Cybermen, and the Daleks.

Gold re-arranged the Doctor Who opening theme in 2010 for Series 5. With the 2010 series, Gold also created two new musical identities for the Eleventh Doctor ("I Am The Doctor" and "A Madman With A Box", replacing themes previously associated with the Ninth and Tenth Doctors), a theme for Amy Pond, the Silurians and the Daleks. He also continued to use the theme for the Cybermen, as well as several action cues such as "Corridors and Fire Escapes" and "All the Strange, Strange Creatures".

Although his music for the 2005 series of Doctor Who relied largely on orchestral samples, his later arrangements for the show, beginning with "The Christmas Invasion", have been more acoustic, often being recorded by the BBC National Orchestra of Wales, supplemented by vocal performances with Melanie Pappenheim and others. One of the most well-known orchestral numbers is "Abigail's Song", sung by Katherine Jenkins, from the 2010 Christmas special "A Christmas Carol", whose soundtrack was released in March 2011. The orchestral scoring (partly reflecting a larger budget) contrasts strongly with music for the classic 1963–1989 series of Doctor Who, as produced by the BBC Radiophonic Workshop, Mark Ayres et al., which generally had an electronic feel, with innovative instrumentation.

Gold also wrote the theme tunes for Doctor Who spin-offs The Sarah Jane Adventures and Torchwood, and composed music for the latter series alongside Ben Foster. A selection of their compositions, entitled Torchwood: Original Television Soundtrack, was made available during August 2008. He arranged the theme tunes to Totally Doctor Who and Doctor Who Confidential, both of which are variations on the Doctor Who theme.

Music written for Doctor Who by Murray Gold has been performed in live concerts. These have included "Doctor Who: A Celebration" at the Millennium Centre in Cardiff in 2006; the Doctor Who Prom at the Royal Albert Hall in London in 2008, 2010, 2013, and 2024; and Doctor Who @60: A Musical Celebration at the Millennium Centre in 2023.

In March 2010, his Doctor Who soundtrack entered UK radio station Classic FM's Hall of Fame as that year's second highest new entry. In 2011, it remained in the Hall of Fame, but three places lower at number 228 out of 300.

Gold announced in February 2018 that he would step down as the programme's composer, having served as the musical director since 2005, and that he would not be composing the music for the eleventh series, which would be instead composed by Segun Akinola (under new executive producer Chris Chibnall).

In April 2023, it was announced that Gold would again return to Doctor Who as composer.

Gold composed "The Goblin Song" for the 2023 Doctor Who Christmas special "The Church on Ruby Road", which reached Number 1 on the UK iTunes Top Songs chart upon release on 11 December 2023. The track peaked at 12 in the UK Official Singles Chart on 15 December 2023. Proceeds from the single were donated to the BBC's charity, Children in Need.

In 2024, Gold appeared in a cameo role in Doctor Who episode "The Devil's Chord".

== Film, stage and radio ==
Gold has scored a number of British and American films, including the BAFTA-winning Kiss of Life directed by Emily Young, Death at a Funeral directed by Frank Oz and Mischief Night, directed by Penny Woolcock. Other projects include Ant & Dec's 2006 film Alien Autopsy and the 2009 drama film Veronika Decides to Die.

In 2001, his radio play Electricity was given the Imison Award—named after former BBC radio drama script editor Richard Imison—for best new play after its broadcast on Radio 3 in 2000. It subsequently transferred to the West Yorkshire Playhouse in 2004 and was performed with Christopher Eccleston in the lead role. Others of his plays include 50 Revolutions performed by the Oxford Stage Company at the Whitehall Theatre, London in 2000 and Resolution at Battersea Arts Centre in 1994.

Gold also wrote the radio play Kafka the Musical, broadcast on Easter Sunday 2011 on BBC Radio 3, starring David Tennant. It won the 2013 Tinniswood Award for the Best Original Radio Drama.
