= Chu Omambala =

British actor

- Other names: Chukwuma Omambala; Chukwuma Ombala; Chu Ombala
- Occupation: Actor

Chu Omambala, sometimes credited as Chukwuma Omambala, Chukwuma Ombala, or Chu Ombala, is a British film, TV and theatre actor.

== Early life and career ==
Omambala studied economics and politics at the University of London. He wasn't interested in reading Shakespeare stories at school, or the theatre in general. He only became interested from watching film and TV, and later realising that his favourite film and TV actors had all started in theatre. He then joined the Royal Central School of Speech and Drama.

== Filmography ==
Omambala has appeared in television roles including Major Blake in the Doctor Who story "The Christmas Invasion" as well as in the 2019 series Queens of Mystery.

=== Television ===
Year	Title	Role	Notes
1999	The Seventh Scroll	Mek Nimmur	2 episodes
2002	White Teeth	Brother Ibrahim	2 episodes
2004	Holby City	Neil Sitwel	1 episode
2005	Doctor Who	Major Blake	1 episode
2006	Judge John Deed	Tony Parfaitt	1 episode
2007	The Whistleblowers	Journalist	1 episode
2008	The Bill	Pete Wright	1 episode
2008	Doctors	Micah Stimpson	1 episode
2009	Casualty	Kev Akua	1 episode
2011	Spooks	Ant Rashaida	1 episode
2012	Treasure Island	Job Anderson	2 episodes
2012	Wolfblood	Mr Okinawe	1 episode
2016	The Best Bottoms in the Land	Himself	
2016	Stan Lee's Lucky Man	Pastor Tejan Tsie	1 episode
2016	Houdini and Doyle	Dr. Randall	1 episode
2017	Liar	Semer	5 episodes
2018	Midsomer Murders	Kwame Asante	1 episode
2019	Flack	Edward Bolton	1 episode
2019	Queens of Mystery	Benjamin Kingston	1 episode
2019	Some Cupid Kills	Bernard Wiseau	1 episode
2022	Magpie Murders	Rev. Robeson / Rev. Osborne	5 episodes

=== Films ===
Year	Title	Role	Notes
2001	The Merchant of Venice	The Prince of Morocco	TV movie
2003	Richard II	Duke of Aumerle	TV movie
2014	Common	Leon King	TV movie

=== Theatre ===
Year	Title	Role	Company	Notes
2022	Scandaltown	Sir Dennis Hedge/Kevin the Postman	Lyric Theatre Hammersmith	Directed by Rachel O'Riordan
	Queen Anne	John Churchill, Duke of Marlborough	Theatre Royal Haymarket	Directed by Natalie Abrahami
	A Midsummer Night's Dream	Oberon	Royal Shakespeare Company	Directed by Erica Whyman
	Hecuba	Odysseus	Royal Shakespeare Company	Directed by Erica Whyman
