= Brian MacArthur =

British newspaper editor (1940–2019)

- Born: 5 February 1940
- Died: 24 March 2019 (aged 79)
- Education: Brentwood School; Helsby Grammar School
- Alma mater: University of Leeds
- Occupation: Journalist

Brian MacArthur (5 February 1940 – 24 March 2019) was a British newspaper editor.

== Early life ==
MacArthur studied at Brentwood School, Helsby Grammar School and the University of Leeds.

== Career ==
In 1962, he entered journalism, his first job being at the Yorkshire Post. After two years, he moved to Manchester to work on the Daily Mail, and he then worked at The Guardian for a year before joining The Times in 1967 where he was Education Correspondent and then founder editor of the Times Higher Education Supplement in 1971. He stood down in 1976 to become News Editor of The Times and was Deputy Editor of the Evening Standard from 1978 to 1979. His next post was Chief Assistant to the Editor of the Sunday Times, then after a year at The Times, he was appointed joint Deputy Editor of the Sunday Times.

He left in 1984 to become Editor of the Western Morning News, but returned to London in 1986 to becoming the founding Editor-in-Chief of Today. One year later, he returned to the Sunday Times as Executive Editor, moving back to The Times in 1991. From 2006 to 2010, he was Assistant Editor of The Daily Telegraph.

MacArthur also wrote and edited several books on historical and journalistic themes, including Eddy Shah: Today and the Newspaper Revolution, Deadline Sunday, Surviving the Sword and For King and Country and edited The Penguin Book of Modern Speeches.

MacArthur died of leukaemia on 24 March 2019.

== Honours ==
In 1997 MacArthur was awarded an honorary MA by the Open University, and in 2011 he received an Honorary Doctorate of Arts from Plymouth University.

MacArthur was interviewed by National Life Stories (C467/11) in 2007 for the 'Oral History of the British Press' collection held by the British Library.

Media offices
Preceded by Richard Bourne	Deputy Editor of the Evening Standard; 1978–1979	Succeeded by Roy Wright
Preceded by Ron Hall and Hugo Young	Deputy Editor of the Sunday Times; 1982–1984 with Hugo Young	Succeeded by Ivan Fallon
Preceded by New position	Editor of Today; 1986–1987	Succeeded by Dennis Hackett
