= The Goblin Song =

2023 single by Murray Gold

Single by Murray Gold
- Released: 11 December 2023
- Genre: Soundtrack; Pop; Novelty
- Length: 2:33
- Label: Silva Screen Records
- Composer: Murray Gold
- Lyricist: Russell T Davies

"The Goblin Song" is an original song created for the television series Doctor Who written by series musical director and composer Murray Gold, with lyrics provided by series showrunner Russell T Davies. Lead vocals are performed by Christina Rotondo, who is accompanied by Lukas DiSparrow on cello.

The song appeared in "The Church on Ruby Road". It was digitally released as a charity single, raising funds for Children in Need.

== Production ==
Rotondo is characterised as a goblin vocalist in the music video and in "The Church on Ruby Road". The Doctor (Ncuti Gatwa) nicknames the goblin as "Janice" or "Janis" in the episode. Davies had originally named the character "Janice", after the singing muppet of The Electric Mayhem. This was changed to "Janis Goblin" by Davies after the connection to singer Janis Joplin was made online, which he described as "a much funnier joke".

== Release ==
The song appeared in "The Church on Ruby Road", the 2023 Doctor Who Christmas Special. The episode features two additional verses which are not featured on the single, sung by The Doctor and Ruby Sunday (Millie Gibson). It was the first of two original songs written for Series 14.

The song was released digitally as a charity single on Apple Music, Deezer, iTunes, and Spotify, raising money for Children in Need, on 11 December 2023, prior to the episode's broadcast. A lyric video was also made available.

The song's release date and visibility saw contemporary press discuss it as a contender for the Christmas No.1 in the UK. The song did not chart.

== Lyric video ==
A lyric video was released on the official Doctor Who YouTube channel. The lyrics of the song describe how the goblins have kidnapped and plan to eat Lulubelle, a human baby. The video is taken from a scene in "The Church on Ruby Road". It features "Janis" and a goblin band performing the song while Lulubelle is moved along a conveyor belt towards the maw of the Goblin King. The Doctor and Ruby are present, attempting to prevent the proceedings.

== Commercial performance ==
The song did not reach the UK singles chart but did enter at #12 on the UK sales chart. It also reached the top of the UK iTunes chart and was placed as high as #13 on its Australian counterpart.
