= Blue Heaven (1994 TV series) =

- Genre: sitcom
- Created by: Frank Skinner
- Written by: Frank Skinner
- Directed by: Tony Dow; Carol Wiseman
- Starring: Frank Skinner; Conleth Hill
- Country of origin: United Kingdom
- Original language: English
- No. of seasons: 1
- No. of episodes: 7

Production
- Running time: 25 minutes
- Production companies: Fine Time Film & Television

Original release
- Network: Channel 4
- Release: 10 June 1992 – 3 September 1994

Blue Heaven is a British television sitcom that starred Frank Skinner, Conleth Hill, John Forgeham, Nadim Sawalha and Paula Wilcox. It featured guest stars such as Bill Bailey, Bob Goody, Tamsin Greig, Lucy Davis, Beryl Reid, Philip Glenister and John Thomson.

It first appeared on Channel 4 as a one-off pilot in the series Bunch of Five in 1992, and was followed by one series of six episodes in 1994. It was described by Skinner as "a love-letter to the Black Country".

== 4 On Demand ==
In 2012 the series was made available free to viewers as part of Channel 4's All 4 website.
