= The Church on Ruby Road =

304 – "The Church on Ruby Road"
- Doctor Who episode
- Promotional poster

Cast
- Doctor: Ncuti Gatwa – Fifteenth Doctor
- Companion: Millie Gibson – Ruby Sunday
- Others: Davina McCall – Herself; Bobby Bradley – Denzel; Mary Malone – Trudy; Belinda Owusu – Woman with Pram; Barney Wilkinson – Policeman; Anita Dobson – Mrs Flood; Hemi Yeroham – Abdul; Michelle Greenidge – Carla Sunday; Angela Wynter – Cherry Sunday; Gemma Arrowsmith – Ruth Lyons; Rachelle Beinart, Jess Judge, Dilu Miah, Giuseppe Lentini, Andrew Francis, Lukas Disparrow – Goblins; Susan Twist – Heckler (uncredited)

Production
- Directed by: Mark Tonderai
- Written by: Russell T Davies
- Produced by: Chris May
- Executive producers: Russell T Davies; Julie Gardner; Jane Tranter; Joel Collins; Phil Collinson
- Music by: Murray Gold
- Running time: 55 minutes
- First broadcast: 25 December 2023

Chronology
← Preceded by "The Giggle"	Followed by → "Space Babies"

"The Church on Ruby Road" is an episode of the British science fiction television series Doctor Who. The episode was broadcast on BBC One on 25 December 2023 as the fourteenth Christmas special since the show's revival in 2005. It is the first Christmas special since "Twice Upon a Time" (2017), with the programme producing New Year's specials from 2018 to 2022. Ncuti Gatwa makes his first regular appearance as the Fifteenth Doctor and the episode introduces Millie Gibson as his companion Ruby Sunday.

The story focuses on the Doctor meeting orphan Ruby Sunday, who was abandoned at a church on Ruby Road, hence her name, and her plight to find her birth parents. Following an interview with Davina McCall (playing a fictional version of herself), the two begin experiencing bad luck wherever they go, because of the antics of goblins, who eventually kidnap a new foster baby.

"The Church on Ruby Road" was filmed along with the fourteenth series with production on the special taking place across Wales in January and February 2023. It was written by Russell T Davies and directed by Mark Tonderai.

== Plot ==
Ruby Sunday, an orphan who lives with her adoptive mother, Carla, and adoptive grandmother, Cherry, is interviewed by Davina McCall for a television programme that traces the participants' lineage. Ruby was abandoned at a church on Ruby Road, Manchester, and hopes to find her birth parents. Following the interview Ruby and Davina begin experiencing bad luck wherever they go. The Fifteenth Doctor arrives and starts to investigate.

Carla receives a new foster baby named Lulubelle, and celebrates the occasion with a photo she hangs on her fridge alongside photos of her other foster children. While Carla steps out, Lulubelle is kidnapped by goblins. Ruby chases after them on to the roof, where she is joined by the Doctor. With the aid of a pair of intelligent gloves that can bear a much greater weight than the user, they climb on to the goblins' flying ship. The Doctor realises the goblins feed on coincidence and accidents, and travel through time to find babies to eat.

The Doctor and Ruby watch as the goblins sing about eating babies, culminating in the King Goblin trying to eat Lulubelle. The pair rescue Lulubelle and escape, returning to Carla's flat. A storm causes a giant crack to appear in the ceiling and Ruby disappears. The Doctor sees Carla change into a different person who has only fostered a few children, resents her mother, and is only concerned with money; Carla and Cherry have no recollection of Ruby. Realising that the goblins went back in time to kill Ruby when she was a baby, the Doctor pursues them.

The Doctor arrives in the past and witnesses the goblins taking Ruby away. Using the gloves, he pulls the ship onto the church's steeple, impaling the King Goblin and causing the ship to disappear. The Doctor leaves Ruby on the church's doorstep to ensure the parson finds her, and sees a woman walking off into the night. The Doctor returns to the present, where he finds everything returning to how it was before, and informs Ruby about what has transpired. He briefly departs in the TARDIS to rescue Davina from being killed by the goblins, then reluctantly decides to leave Ruby behind. Ruby, however, follows him and steps into the TARDIS.

After the Doctor and Ruby depart, Ruby's neighbour, Mrs Flood, breaks the fourth wall by looking at the camera and saying, "Never seen a TARDIS before?"

== Production ==
Behind the scenes compilation of filming.

=== Development ===
In November 2022, Davies was quoted in Doctor Who Magazine as having written a further special episode outside of the 60th anniversary specials. It is the first Doctor Who Christmas special since "Twice Upon a Time" (2017) after the programme temporarily transitioned New Year's specials from 2018 to 2022 under the preceding showrunner Chris Chibnall. Davies also said that when creating the goblins he wanted to lean more into the supernatural and unexplainable side of Doctor Who the programme was not able to previously explore. The read through for the episode took place on 12 January 2023. The unnamed television programme Ruby appears on was inspired by Long Lost Family, which is also hosted by McCall. The Long Lost Family production team assisted in its depiction in "The Church on Ruby Road".

When designing the goblin band's outfits, costume designer Pam Downe ensured that each goblin had their own "complete personality and specific look", rather than having "generic" appearances. Orchestral recordings for the episode took place at the Wales Millennium Centre in January 2023 with the BBC National Orchestra of Wales. Murray Gold cited Aladdin as inspiration when composing music for "The Goblin Song". The scene involving the Doctor rescuing Ruby from a giant snowman, followed by him telling a policeman that his girlfriend will say "yes" to his proposal, was the last scene to be added. Disney tested the episode and asked Russell T Davies to add an extra scene in the beginning so that the Doctor could be introduced sooner. Davies felt positive about the decision adding, "who doesn't want to see Ncuti?" The episode's title and official airdate were announced via a Disney+ press release on 5 November 2023.

=== Filming ===
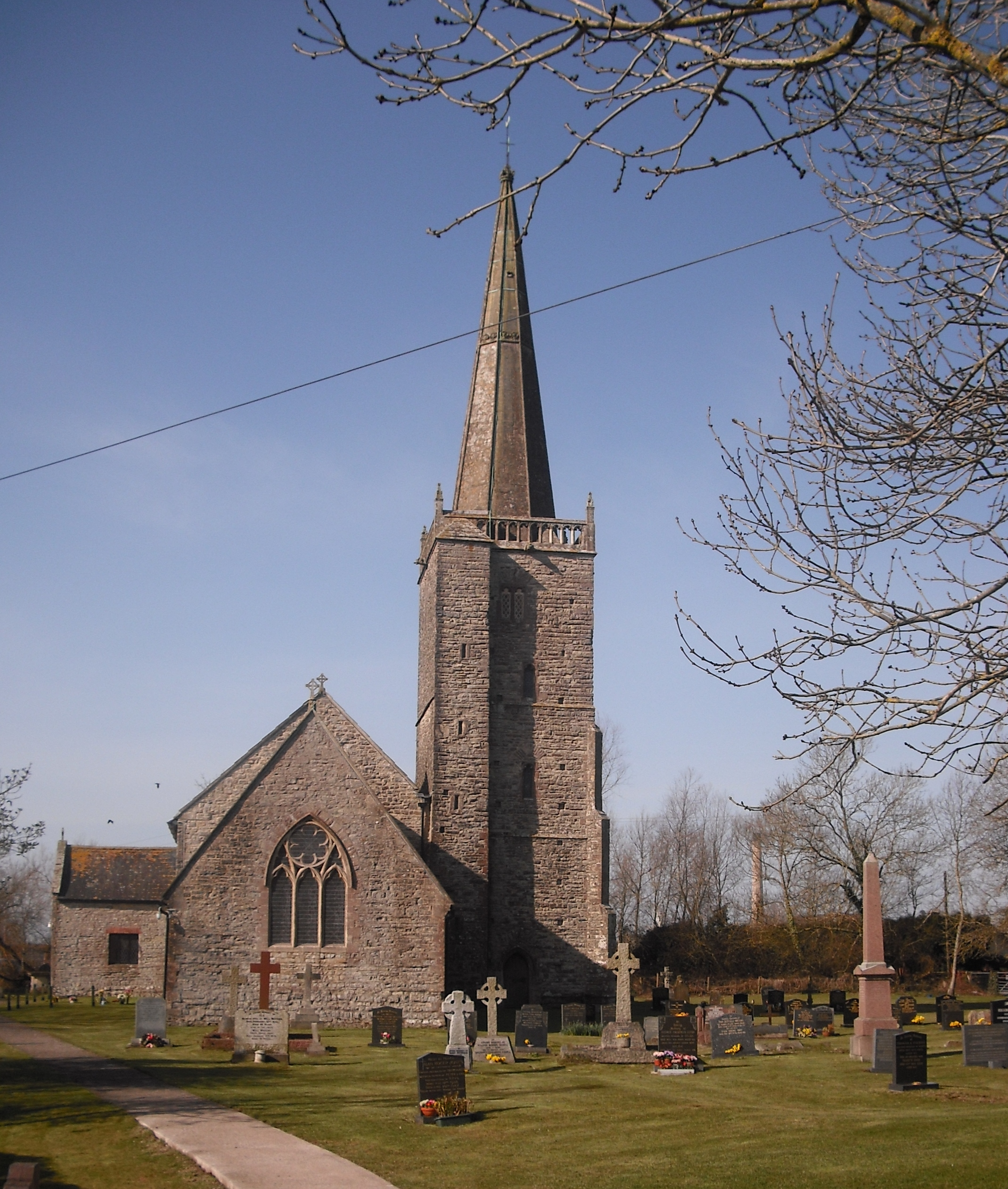
St Mary's Church in Nash, Newport was used as the titular church on Ruby Road.

"The Church on Ruby Road" was directed by Mark Tonderai who previously directed the eleventh series episodes "The Ghost Monument" and "Rosa" (both 2018). It was filmed along with the fourteenth series in the series' stand-alone second production block. The episode was also the third of the fourteenth series to be filmed, following the series' fifth episode, "Dot and Bubble", and preceding the series premiere, "Space Babies". Filming on the goblin ship set occurred on 20 February 2023. Only 12–15 extras were used as goblins for those scenes. It took five people to control the King Goblin prop during filming. The production team continuously changed their outfits and relocated them around the set to make the number appear larger. Scenes were filmed at St Mary's Church in Nash, Newport on 14 and 15 January 2023. Additional filming there also took place from 14 February. Soap foam and paper was used to create fake snow for this scene. The top of the church's steeple was replicated on a soundstage at Wolf Studios Wales. "The Goblin Song" was filmed on a green screen on 3 March 2023.

The added scene with the inflatable snowman was filmed later in the year and prior to the 15th series' first production block, with Millie Gibson on 16 September 2023 and Ncuti Gatwa on 3 October 2023.

=== Casting ===
On 8 May 2022, Ncuti Gatwa was announced as Jodie Whittaker's successor as the programme's lead, and many reports, including that of the BBC itself stated he would play the Fourteenth Doctor and that Whittaker's Thirteenth Doctor would regenerate into an incarnation portrayed by Gatwa. Later clarification announced that Gatwa would actually portray the Fifteenth Doctor, with the Fourteenth portrayed by David Tennant for the 2023 specials. Auditions for the next companion took place on 24 September 2022. On 18 November 2022, during Children in Need, Millie Gibson was announced as the new companion Ruby Sunday.

On 30 November 2023, it was announced that Davina McCall would be cast as herself in the special, and that Michelle Greenidge, Angela Wynter, and Anita Dobson had been cast as Carla, Ruby Sunday's mother; Cherry, Ruby Sunday's grandmother; and Mrs Flood respectively. Susan Twist appears uncredited as a heckler at Ruby's band's concert, after appearing as Mrs Merridew in "Wild Blue Yonder" (2023). Her return appearance caused fans to speculate that she would appear again in future episodes.

== Broadcast and reception ==
Professional ratings
Aggregate scores
Source	Rating
Rotten Tomatoes (Tomatometer)	100%
Rotten Tomatoes (Average Score)	8.1/10
Review scores
Source	Rating
Empire	4/5 stars
The Daily Telegraph	3/5 stars
The Guardian	4/5 stars
The Independent	5/5 stars

=== Broadcast ===
An early premiere screening occurred on 12 December 2023 in London. "The Church on Ruby Road" was broadcast on BBC One on 25 December 2023. Disney+ released the episode simultaneously in the United States and also handled international distribution of the episode.

=== Ratings ===
The episode received overnight ratings of 4.73 million viewers, making it the third most watched programme of Christmas Day, behind King Charles's annual Christmas speech and Strictly Come Dancing, as well as the most watched drama programme of the day. The consolidated ratings figures for the episode were 7.49 million viewers, making it the 3rd most watched programme across all UK television channels for the entire week, and the episode received an Appreciation Index score of 82.

=== Critical reception ===
On the review aggregator website Rotten Tomatoes, 100% of 28 critics' reviews are positive, with an average rating of 8/10. The website's consensus reads: "A welcome sugar rush of festive adventure, 'The Church on Ruby Road' sees Ncuti Gatwa's tenure as the Doctor off to a merry start."

In a positive review for The Guardian, Martin Belam said of Ncuti Gatwa's performance: "Whether representing the gin-and-tonic division of health and safety, bounding across roofs, showing off his mavity gloves, or telling a policeman his fiancée would say yes, Gatwa oozed charm. But when needed, he turned on the seriousness like a tap". In a more critical review for the same newspaper, television critic Leila Latif expressed concern over the episode's over-reliance on the sonic screwdriver, but stated that "[A] delightful new era captained by Davies and Gatwa seems certain."

Ruby Sunday was also positively received by critics. Empire's Jordan King praised the character's dynamics with Gatwa's Fifteenth Doctor, and commented that "there's more than enough in Gibson's performance to suggest far greater depths yet for her to explore with the character." In a more mixed review for the Daily Telegraph, Benji Wilson felt the special to be a "muddled story that flew off in all directions". He criticised the design of the goblins and the king as "knockoffs" to the Gremlins and the "bizarre" song. Chris Allcock from Den of Geek had mixed views on the episode. He viewed the Doctor's killing of the goblin king to be "out of character". Allcock further criticised the Goblins as villains, noting that their hostility and motives were never explained.

== Home media ==
The Church on Ruby Road
- Author: Esmie Jikiemi-Pearson
- Series: Doctor Who book: Target novelisations
- Publisher: BBC Books
- Publication date: 25 January 2024
- Pages: 160
- ISBN: 9781785948695

"The Church on Ruby Road" received an individual DVD and Blu-ray release on 12 February 2024. The episode was also included on the fourteenth series home media sets, which was released on 12 August.

=== In print ===
A novelisation of the episode, written by Esmie Jikiemi-Pearson, was released in hardback on 25 January 2024 as part of the Target Collection. An audiobook read by Angela Wynter was released on the same day.
