= Conleth Hill =

Irish actor (born 1964)

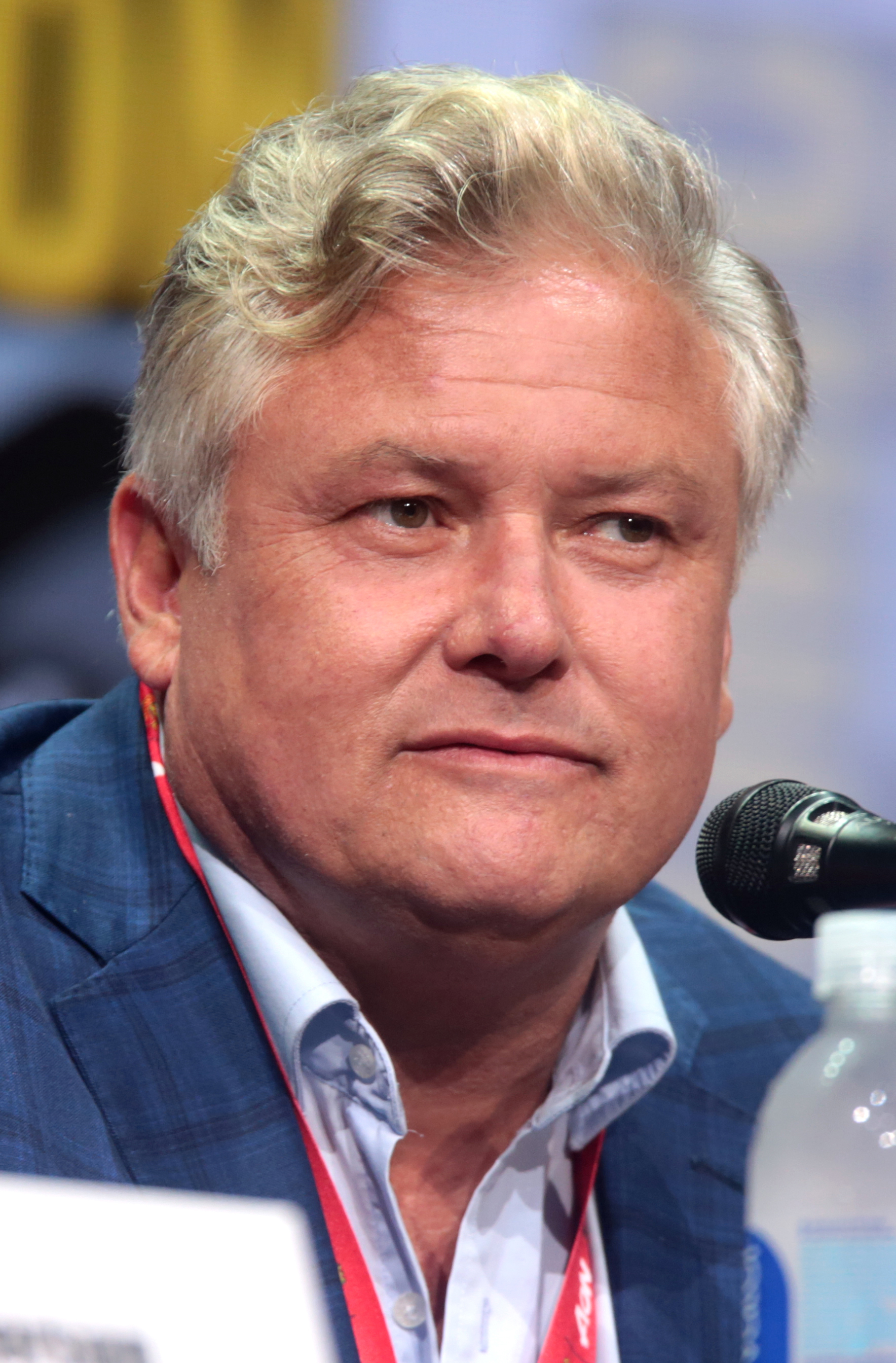
- Hill at the 2017 San Diego Comic-Con
- Born: Conleth Seamus Eoin Croiston Hill; 24 November 1964 (age 61); Ballycastle, County Antrim, Northern Ireland
- Occupation: Actor
- Years active: 1986–present
- Awards: Olivier Award for Best Actor; 2001: Stones in His Pockets; 2005: The Producers

Conleth Seamus Eoin Croiston Hill (born 24 November 1964) is an Irish actor. He has performed on stage in productions in the UK, Ireland, Canada and the US. He has won two Laurence Olivier Awards and received two Tony Award nominations. He is best known for his role as spymaster Varys in the HBO fantasy series Game of Thrones (2011–2019).

== Early life ==
Conleth Hill was born in Ballycastle in County Antrim, Northern Ireland. He has an older brother who works as a cameraman, a sister who is a producer, and a younger brother, Ronan, who is a sound engineer who has won four Emmy Awards for his sound mixing on Game of Thrones.

Hill attended St MacNissi's College, Garron Tower and graduated from the Guildhall School of Music and Drama's (Clothworkers Company Scholar) acting programme in 1989.

== Career ==
Hill made his Broadway debut in Marie Jones' Stones in His Pockets. For his work in the Canadian production of the play he received a Dora Mavor Moore Award. He played the German professor Max Staefel in a television adaptation of Goodbye, Mr Chips (2002). He played "Mum" to Peter Kay's character, Geraldine McQueen, in Peter Kay's Britain's Got the Pop Factor... and Possibly a New Celebrity Jesus Christ Soapstar Superstar Strictly on Ice, a spoof on the talent show genre of programmes. He also played the role of Edward Darby in the television series Suits, alongside his Game of Thrones co-star, Michelle Fairley.

From 2011 to 2019, Hill appeared as Varys in the television series Game of Thrones, based on George R. R. Martin's novel series A Song of Ice and Fire. Martin hinted, in a February 2013 post on his website, that he thought Hill would be a good choice to play the title character in a TV show based on Martin's science fiction novel Tuf Voyaging. He also appeared as Carlos Santini in Season 3, Episode 4 of Derry Girls.

== Filmography ==
=== Films ===
| Year | Title | Role | Notes |
|---|---|---|---|
| 1994 | A Man You Don't Meet Every Day | Michael | |
| 1998 | Crossmaheart | Coulter | Also known as Dead Man's Girl (DVD) |
| 2003 | Intermission | Robert (Teacher) | |
| 2009 | Whatever Works | Brockman | |
| 2009 | Perrier's Bounty | Russ | |
| 2009 | National Theatre Live: All's Well That End's Well | Parolles | |
| 2011 | The Shore | Paddy | Short film |
| 2011 | National Theatre Live: The Cherry Orchard | Lopakhin | |
| 2011 | Salmon Fishing in the Yemen | Bernard Sugden | |
| 2012 | Whole Lotta Sole | Barber | Also known as Stand Off (North America) |
| 2012 | Keith Lemon: The Film | Delivery Man | |
| 2014 | Shooting for Socrates | Jackie Fullerton | |
| 2014 | Serena | Dr. Chaney | |
| 2014 | The Good Word | Da Taggart | Short film |
| 2015 | Two Down | Harry Montague | |
| 2015 | A Patch of Fog | Sandy Duffy | |
| 2016 | The Truth Commissioner | Johnny Rafferty | |
| 2016 | Two Angry Men | Ritchie McKee | Short film |
| 2017 | National Theatre Live: Who's Afraid of Virginia Woolf? | George | |
| 2018 | The Isle | Douglas Innis | (Also executive producer) |
| 2019 | Official Secrets | Roger Alton | |
| 2020 | Herself | Aido Deveney | |
| 2020 | Here Are the Young Men | Mark Kearney | |
| 2021 | To Olivia | Marty Ritt | |
| 2021 | Infinitum: Subject Unknown | Professor Aaron Östergaard | |
| 2023 | Tell Me a Creepy Story | Da Taggart | (Segment: The Good Word) |
| 2026 | The Sheep Detectives | Ham Gilyard | |

=== Television ===
| Year | Title | Role | Notes |
|---|---|---|---|
| 1988 | Boon | Second Pupil | Series 3; Episode 7: "Honourable Service" |
| 1988 | Casualty | Rob | Series 4; Episode 4: "Day Off" |
| 1990 | ScreenPlay | Soldier | Series 5; Episode 4: "The Englishman's Wife" |
| 1990 | Medics | Liam McGuinness | Series 1; Episode 4: "Niall" |
| 1992 | Bunch of Five | Roache | Episode 2: "Blue Heaven" (Pilot for series Blue Heaven) |
| 1992 | On the Up | Deliveryman | Series 3; Episode 1: "The Golf Tournament" |
| 1992 | Screen One | Neil | Series 4; Episode 8: "Trust Me" |
| 1993 | The Bill | Michael White | Series 9; Episode 40: "Hard Evidence" |
| 1994 | Blue Heaven | Roache | Episodes 1–6 |
| 1994 | Lit by Love and Sunshine | Narrator | |
| 1995 | Casualty | Theo | Series 9; Episode 24: "Duty of Care" |
| 1995 | Crown Prosecutor | Neville Osborn | Episode 9 |
| 1996 | Out of the Deep Pan | Derek | Television film |
| 2000 | Meaningful Sex | Carl | Television short film |
| 2001 | TV to Go | Con | Series 1; Episode 2 |
| 2002 | Goodbye, Mr. Chips | Max Staefel | Television film |
| 2007 | Ronni Ancona & Co | Various roles | Episodes 1–3 |
| 2007 | The Life and Times of Vivienne Vyle | Jared | Episodes 1–6 |
| 2008 | Britain's Got the Pop Factor... | Geraldine's Mum | Television film (Reality show parody by Peter Kay) |
| 2011–2019 | Game of Thrones | Lord Varys | Recurring role (season 1), main role (seasons 2–8); 46 episodes |
| 2012 | Little Crackers | Sharon's Dad | Series 3; Episode 11: "Sharon Horgan's Little Cracker: The Week Before Christmas" |
| 2013 | Suits | Edward Darby | Seasons 2 & 3 (6 episodes) |
| 2014 | Inside No. 9 | Stevie | Series 1; Episode 3: "Tom & Gerri" |
| 2014 | That Day We Sang | Frank | Television film |
| 2014 | Sherlock | Uncredited role | Episode: "The Empty Hearse" |
| 2015 | Foyle's War | Sir Ian Woodhead | Series 8; Episode 3: "Elise" |
| 2015 | Arthur & George | Sergeant Upton | Mini-series; Episodes 1–3 |
| 2017 | Stan Lee's Lucky Man | Reverend Anthony Huxley | Series 2; Episode 2: "Playing with Fire" |
| 2017 | Peter Kay's Car Share | Elsie | Series 2; Episode 2: "The Smurf" |
| 2018 | Dave Allen at Peace | John Tynan-O'Mahony | Television film |
| 2018 | 12 Monkeys | Interpol Agent Bonham | Series 4; Episodes 2 & 3: "Ouroboros" and "45 RPM" |
| 2018 | Hang Ups | Jon Pitt | 4 episodes |
| 2019 | Doc Martin | Dr. Edward Mullen | Series 9; Episodes 4 & 6: "Paint It Black" and "Equilibrium" |
| 2019 | Dublin Murders | Superintendent O'Kelly | Episodes 1–8 |
| 2019–2024 | Vienna Blood | Mendel Liebermann | Series 1–4 (12 episodes) |
| 2022 | Magpie Murders | Alan Conway | Episodes 1–6 |
| 2022 | St. Mungo's | Pronsias Stevenson | Television film |
| 2022 | Holding | Sgt. PJ Collins | Episodes 1–4 |
| 2022 | Why Didn't They Ask Evans? | Dr. Alwyn Thomas | Mini-series; Episode 1 |
| 2022 | Derry Girls | Carlos Santini | Series 3; Episode 4: "The Haunting" |
| 2023 | The Lovers | Philip | Episodes 1 & 6 |
| 2023, 2025 | The Power of Parker | Martin Parker | Series 1 & 2; 12 episodes |
| 2024 | 3 Body Problem | Pope Gregory XIII | Series 1; Episode 3: "Destroyer of Worlds" |
| 2024 | Inside No. 9 | Party Guest | Series 9; Episode 6: "Plodding On" |
| 2024 | The Cleaner | Brennan | Series 3; Episode 4: "The Lighthouse" |
| 2024 | Moonflower Murders | Alan Conway | Episodes 1, 2 & 4–6 |
| 2025 | Suspect: The Shooting of Jean Charles de Menezes | Commissioner Sir Ian Blair | Episodes 1–4 |

=== Video games ===
| Year | Title | Voice role | Notes | Ref. |
|---|---|---|---|---|
| 2012 | Game of Thrones | Lord Varys | Based on the TV series of the same name | |

=== Audio books ===
| Year | Book | Character | Publisher | Ref. |
|---|---|---|---|---|
| 2008 | Tamburlaine: Shadow of God by John Fletcher | Hafez | BBC Worldwide Ltd. | |
| 2009 | Zurich (The Wire) by Pearse Elliott | Narrator | BBC Worldwide Ltd. | |

== Radio ==
| Date | Title | Role | Author | Director | Station |
|---|---|---|---|---|---|
| 25 December 2000 | The Man Who Came to Dinner | | Moss Hart and George S Kaufman adapted for radio by Marcy Kahan | Ned Chaillet | BBC Radio 4 |
| 7 November 2002 | Tricycles | | Colin Teevan | Toby Swift | BBC Radio 3 The Wire |
| 18 February 2004 | The Travels of Marco Polo | | Philip Palmer | Toby Swift | BBC Radio 4 Afternoon Play |
| 19 April 2012 | Titanic letters | Reader, ep.33 | | Ciaran Hinds | BBC Radio Ulster |
| 24 April 2012 | The Biggest Issues | Jerry Cartwright | Annie McCartney | Eoin O'Callaghan | BBC Radio 4 Afternoon Drama |
| 2017 | Big Country | JD Quinn | Patrick Kielty | | BBC Radio Ulster |

== Theatre ==
=== Stage productions ===
- Winners by Brian Friel, as Joe; One day in summer in a garden as Uncle Jim, Incredible adventure of doctor Faustus as Mephistopheles secretary, Fools' bar Various Roles, Fringe Benefits Theatre Company (1984–85)
- The Adventures of a Bear Called Paddington, Various Roles, the Arts Theatre, Ardhowen Theatre, Belfast; Riverside Theatre, Coleraine (1986)
- West Side Story, as Bernardo - Leader of the Sharks, Ulster Youth Theatre (1986)
- Broken Nails by Damian Gorman, as Joe, St Peter's Cathedral in West Belfast (1988)
- Orlando, Guildhall School of Music and Drama (1988)
- Girl Crazy, Guildhall School of Music & Drama (1989)
- Little Shop of Horrors, Lyric Theatre (Belfast) (1989)
- The School for Wives as Horace, The John Player Theatre, The Arts Theatre (Belfast) (1989)
- The Picture of Dorian Gray, as Dorian, Arts Theatre (Belfast) (1989)
- Too Late To Talk To Billy as John Fletcher, Arts Theatre, 1990
- Oliver Twist as Artful Dodger / Mr.Limbkins etc. Lyric Theatre (1990)
- Over the bridge by Sam Thompson as Ephraim Smart, Lyric Theatre (1990)
- Playboy of the Western World as Shawn Keogh, Lyric Theatre (1990)
- The Iceman Cometh as Willie Oban, Lyric Theatre (Belfast) (1990)
- The Importance of Being Earnest as Algernon, Lyric Theatre (Belfast) (1990)
- Leave him to heaven, The Arts Theatre (Belfast) (1991)
- Government inspector Playwright Marie Jones Adapted Nikolai Gogol, as Headmaster, The Rock Theatre (1993)
- Christmas Eve Can Kill You, Lyric Theatre (Belfast) (1994)
- Playboy of the Western World as Christy Mahon, Redgrave Theatre, Farnham (1994)
- Tall Tales for Small People (Tall Tales For Cold, Dark Nights), Communicado (Scotland) (1995)
- Eddie Bottom's dream by Marie Jones, as Puck, Lyric Theatre (Belfast)
- Stones in His Pockets as Charlie, Lyric Theatre (Belfast); Gaiety Theatre (Dublin); Traverse Theatre (Edinburgh); Tricycle, New Ambassadors, Duke of York's (London); Winter Garden Theatre (Toronto); Golden Theater, (New York) (1996 with Tim Murphy) (1999 with Sean Campion)
- No Stars On Sunday by Tim Loane, Old museum Arts Center (Belfast) (1998)
- A Midsummer Night's Dream as Nick Bottom, Lyric Theatre (Belfast) (1997)
- Playboy of the Western World as Christy Mahon, Lyric Theatre (Belfast) (1997)
- Shining Souls, Old Vic (London) (1997)
- The Suicide by Nikolai Erdman, as Semyon Podsekalnikov, Communicado (Scotland) (1997)
- Juno and the Paycock as Joxer Daly, Royal Lyceum (Edinburgh) (1998)
- Northern Star by Stewart Parker, as Henry Joy McCraken, Field Day/Tinderbox (1998)
- Christmas Carol, Communicado (Scotland) (1998)
- A Whistle in the Dark as Michael Carney, Lyric Theatre (Belfast) (1999)
- Criminal Genius as motel manager Phillie, Prime Cut Productions (Belfast) (1999)
- Waiting for Godot as Estragon, Lyric Theatre (Belfast) (1999)
- Conversations on a Homecoming as Michael, Lyric Theatre (Belfast) (2002)
- After Darwin as Charles Darwin, Prime Cut Productions (Dublin and Belfast) (2002)
- The Chance as Daniel, Prime Cut Productions (Belfast) (2002)
- Democracy as Gunter Guillaume, National Theatre (London) (2003)
- The Producers as Roger DeBris, Theatre Royal, Drury Lane (London) (2004)
- Shoot the Crow as Petesy, Trafalgar Studios (London); Royal Exchange Theatre (Manchester) (2005)
- Endgame as Hamm, Prime Cut Productions (Belfast) (2006)
- Philistines as Teterev, National Theatre (London) (2007)
- The Seafarer, as Ivan Curry, National Theatre (London); Booth Theatre (New York) (2007)
- Dallas Sweetman as Dallas Sweetman, Canterbury Cathedral (2008)
- All's Well that Ends Well as Parolles, National Theatre (London) (2009)
- Home Place as Richard, Lyric Theatre (Belfast) (2009)
- STARS – A Ballycastle Nativity by Damian Gorman, Cross & Passion College and Ballycastle High School (Ballycastle) (2009)
- White Guard as Leonid Shervinskiy, National Theatre (London) (2010)
- The Cherry Orchard, as Lopakhin, National Theatre, London (2011)
- Uncle Vanya as Uncle Vanya, Lyric Theatre (Belfast) (2011)
- Quartermaine's Terms, as Henry, Wyndham's Theatre, London (2013)
- Macbeth, as Macbeth, Berkeley Repertory Theatre, Berkeley (2016)
- Who's Afraid of Virginia Woolf?, as George, Harold Pinter Theatre, London (2017)
- SPUD, Lyric Theatre (Belfast) Director (2019)
- The Antipodes, as Sandy, National Theatre, London (2019)
- King Lear, Dublin Gate Theatre (2025)

== Awards and nominations ==
- 2000 Irish Times award, for Stones in His Pockets
- 2001 Olivier Awards, Best Actor, for Stones in His Pockets
- 2001 Tony Award nomination, Best Actor in a Play, for Stones in His Pockets
- 2001 Drama Desk Award, Special Award, for Stones in His Pockets
- 2001 Outer Critics Circle Award, for Stones in His Pockets
- 2001 Whatsonstage award, Best Actor for Stones in His Pockets
- 2001 Dora Awards, for Stones in His Pockets
- 2005 The Critics Circle Theatre Awards, winner of Best Musical for "The Producers"
- 2005 Olivier Awards, Best Performance in a Supporting Role in a Musical, for The Producers
- 2008 Tony Award nomination, Best Featured Actor in a Play, for The Seafarer
- 2008 Drama Desk Award for Outstanding Featured Actor in a Play, for The Seafarer
- 2011–2016 nominated for Screen Actors Guild Award for Outstanding Performance by an Ensemble in a Drama Series for Game of Thrones
