= Alexandros Logothetis =

Greek film and television actor (born 1970)

- Born: 1970 (age 55–56); Athens, Greece
- Occupation: Actor
- Years active: 1996–present
- Known for: To Nisi (The Island, 2010)

Alexandros Logothetis (Greek: Αλέξανδρος Λογοθέτης) (born 1970) is a Greek stage, film and television actor known for his roles in the Greek television series To Nisi (The Island), and the British TV mini-series Magpie Murders and Moonflower Murders.

== Biography ==
Alexandros Logothetis was born in Athens, Greece, in 1970. His father was the actor Ilias Logothetis (1939 – 2024), and his mother is a writer, Efthychia Kalliteraki. He was brought up by his mother, after his parents divorced when he was three years old. Logothetis studied at the National Theatre of Greece Drama School, graduating in 1991. He later studied at the Arts Educational Schools, London, where he graduated with an MA in acting in 1998.

== Career ==
Logothetis has had major roles in Greek television shows including the 2010 series To Nisi (Greek: Το Νησί; English: The Island), which was based on the novel The Island by Victoria Hislop. In 2003, Logothetis was awarded Best Supporting Actor at the Greek State Film Awards for his role in the 2003 film Gamilia narki. Logothetis also features in the 2007 - 2008 television series The 10. Logothetis has starred in many Greek films, most recently The Promotion (Exilixi), for which Logothetis won a jury award for Best Performance at the San Francisco Greek Film Festival in 2024.

From 2021 to 2024 Logothetis had roles in several English-language TV mini-series. The first was Magpie Murders, based on a novel by Anthony Horowitz, which was filmed in 2021 and aired on PBS and Britbox in 2022, and BBC One in 2023. The second was the 2024 mini-series Moonflower Murders, based on another Horowitz novel.

== Filmography ==
=== Film ===
Year	Title	Role	Notes	Ref.
1993	Starry Dome		Film debut	
1993	Date		short film	
1993	The American			
1994	Short trip		short film	
1995	Like a prairie cock in Wyoming	Michalis		
1996	Business in Balkans	Alexandros		
1998	Black Out	voice		
2003	Wedding mine	Kostas		
2003	Dinos the doorman	Dinos	short film	
2005	Exit		short film	
2005	Chariton's Choir	Perikles		
2005	The photographer of Trikala		short film	
2006	Truth		short film	
2006	Showtime	Filippos	short film	
2007	Alter Ego	Argiris		
2007	Secrets and lies	narrator	documentary	
2008	Instructions for use		short film	
2008	Angels' Bet	Angel	short film	
2009	The Happy Life	cartoon artist	short film	
2009	The canteen	Filippos		
2009	Schmuck	Costas	short film	
2010	The Flight of the Swan	Stelios		
2011	Alter	painter	short film	
2012	Half-Board Heaven		short film	
2012	Something will happen	Aris	short film	
2013	The Tree and the Swing	young Kyriakos	voice role	
2013	Wild Duck	Dimitris		
2013	Treaty 10/60	professor	short film	
2013	From the earth to the moon	John Maston		
2014	At home	Stefanos		
2014	Polk	unknown man		
2015	Stagnation	Vangelis	short film	
2015	Without milk	Tasos	short film	
2015	The Republic	Antonis Bournazos		
2016	Amerika Square	Manolis		
2019	Adults in the Room	Manos		
2019	@9 at 9	mr. Mermigas		
2019	In the strange pursuit of Laura Durand	Chrysanthos		
2020	Monday	Yorgos		
2021	Saison morte			
2022	Venizelos: Struggle for Asia Minor	narrator	documentary	
2023	Midnight Skin	doctor K	short film	
2023	Promotion	Nikos		
2024	Underground		short film	
2024	Skeleton Tree	Manos	short film	
2024	Salty Amazons	Nikos Kakkavias	short film	

=== Television ===
Year	Title	Role(s)	Notes
1991-1992	Sacrifice		Main role, 18 episodes
1992-1993	Women		Main role, 25 episodes
1992	Anatomy of a crime	Minas Mentidis	Episode: "Fatal relationship"
1992	Anatomy of a crime		Episode: "No mercy"
1992	Anatomy of a crime	Fotis	Episode: "Short circuit"
1993	Moral Department	Spyros Markatos	Episode: "Searching"
1993	Anatomy of a crime		Episode: "Hunter"
1993	Anatomy of a crime	Aris	Episode: "Jealousy"
1993	Anatomy of a crime		Episode: "This is a trial eye"
2005-2006	Stand by me	Iasonas	Lead role, 17 episodes
2007–2008	The 10	doctor	10 episodes
2010–2011	The Island	Nikolas Kyritsis	Main role, 17 episodes
2016-2017	Farewell my sweet co-mother-in-law	Giorgos Giovanis	Lead role, 12 episodes
2017	The Durrells	Lunar Nerd	1 episode
2019-2020	Home Is	Sotiris Pitsoulis	Lead role, 38 episodes (8 unaired)
2021	42°C	Michalis	Lead role, 8 episodes
2021	Postcard	Takis Stakakis	Episode: "The kiosk"
2022	Commandos and Dragons	narrator (voice role)	1 episode
2022	A night in August	Nikolas Kyritsis	Lead role, 14 episodes
2023–2025	The Beach	Dionysis Arhontakis	Lead role, 284 episodes
2024	Moonflower Murders	Andreas Patakis	TV mini series
2025-present	The child	Nikos Palaionikos	Lead role
