= Hugo Young =

British journalist

Hugo John Smelter Young (13 October 1938 – 22 September 2003) was a British journalist and columnist and senior political commentator at The Guardian.

== Early life and education ==
Born in Sheffield into an old recusant Roman Catholic family, he was head boy at Ampleforth College in North Yorkshire during his youth; later, he read law at Balliol College, Oxford, and worked for the Yorkshire Post in Leeds from 1961. In 1963, he spent a year as a Harkness Fellow in the United States and he spent the next year working as a congressional fellow.

== Journalistic career ==
In 1965, Young returned to the United Kingdom. He was recruited by Denis Hamilton of The Sunday Times. In his second year there, he became chief leader writer, a position he kept until 1977. From 1973–84, he was also the paper's political editor. He established a Sunday column, "Inside Politics", that made him famous. Beginning in 1981, he also held the position of joint deputy editor. However, Young's relationship with The Sunday Times cooled notably when Rupert Murdoch took over the paper in 1981. The conflict culminated in a series of battles with editor Andrew Neil, particularly over the US invasion of Grenada in 1983. This ultimately led to Young's leaving The Sunday Times and joining The Guardian in 1984.

Young continued to write a twice-weekly political column at The Guardian until his death. Young was a strong proponent of European integration, and sharply expressed his disappointment with the British government's eurosceptic politics in his columns, including Prime Minister Tony Blair's decision to side with George W. Bush instead of his EU partners in the 2003 invasion of Iraq.

Despite these differences, Young remained on good terms with senior ministers, including Tony Blair and Margaret Thatcher. He wrote a critical biography of the latter, One of Us (1989), in addition to a very critical article that he wrote two weeks before his death but which was not published until after Thatcher's death, nearly ten years after his own. He wrote other books, including This Blessed Plot: Britain and Europe from Churchill to Blair, which was published in 1998. From 1989 onward, Young was the chairman of the Scott Trust, which owns The Guardian and other news media, and helped the paper through important developments such as the purchase of The Observer. His papers are held at the Guardian News & Media Archive in London.

== The Hugo Young Lecture ==
There is now an annual Hugo Young Lecture, organised by The Guardian in Young's memory. Among the notable figures to have delivered it are David Cameron, Nick Clegg, Ed Miliband, Marjorie Scardino and Alex Salmond.

== Personal life ==
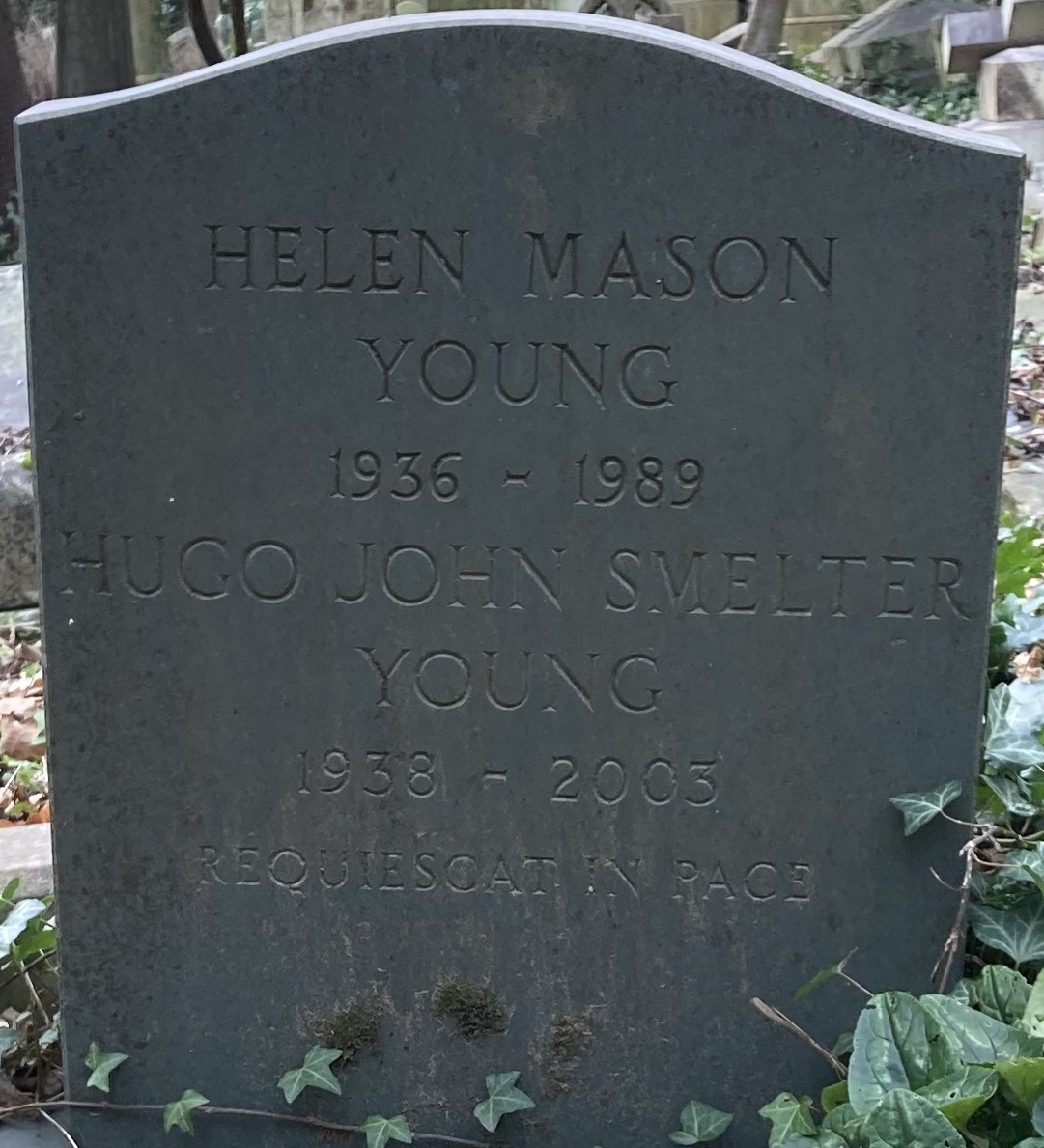
Grave of Hugo Young in Highgate Cemetery

Young married twice. His first wife, Helen Mason, died in 1989 of lung cancer. They had three daughters, including the film director Emily Young, and one son.

He remarried in 1990, this time to American artist Lucy Waring. Young died at the age of 64 of colon cancer, and was buried on the west side of Highgate Cemetery.

== Bibliography ==
- The Hugo Young Papers: Thirty Years of British Politics – Off the Record (2008) ISBN 978-1-84614-054-9 (published posthumously)
- Supping with the Devils: Political Journalism (2003) ISBN 1-84354-116-5
- Political Lives (2001) ISBN 0-19-860430-0
- This Blessed Plot: Britain and Europe from Churchill to Blair (1998) ISBN 0-333-57992-5
- Thatcherism: Did Society Survive? (The Maisie Ward Sheed memorial lecture) (1992) ISBN 0-903113-97-X
- One of Us: Life of Margaret Thatcher (1989) ISBN 0-333-34439-1
  - The Iron Lady: A Biography of Margaret Thatcher (1989) ISBN 0-374-22651-2 (US edition of One of Us, to distinguish it from the US biography of Richard Nixon entitled One of Us)
- The Thatcher Phenomenon (1986) ISBN 0-563-20472-9
- But, Chancellor: Inquiry into the Treasury (1984) ISBN 0-563-20237-8
- No, Minister (1982) ISBN 0-563-20056-1
- Crossman Affair (1976) ISBN 0-241-89449-2

Media offices
Preceded by Frank Giles	Deputy Editor of the Sunday Times; 1981–1984 with Ron Hall (1981–1982); Brian MacArthur (1982–1984)	Succeeded by Ivan Fallon
