= Ian Porter (actor) =

English actor (born 1965)

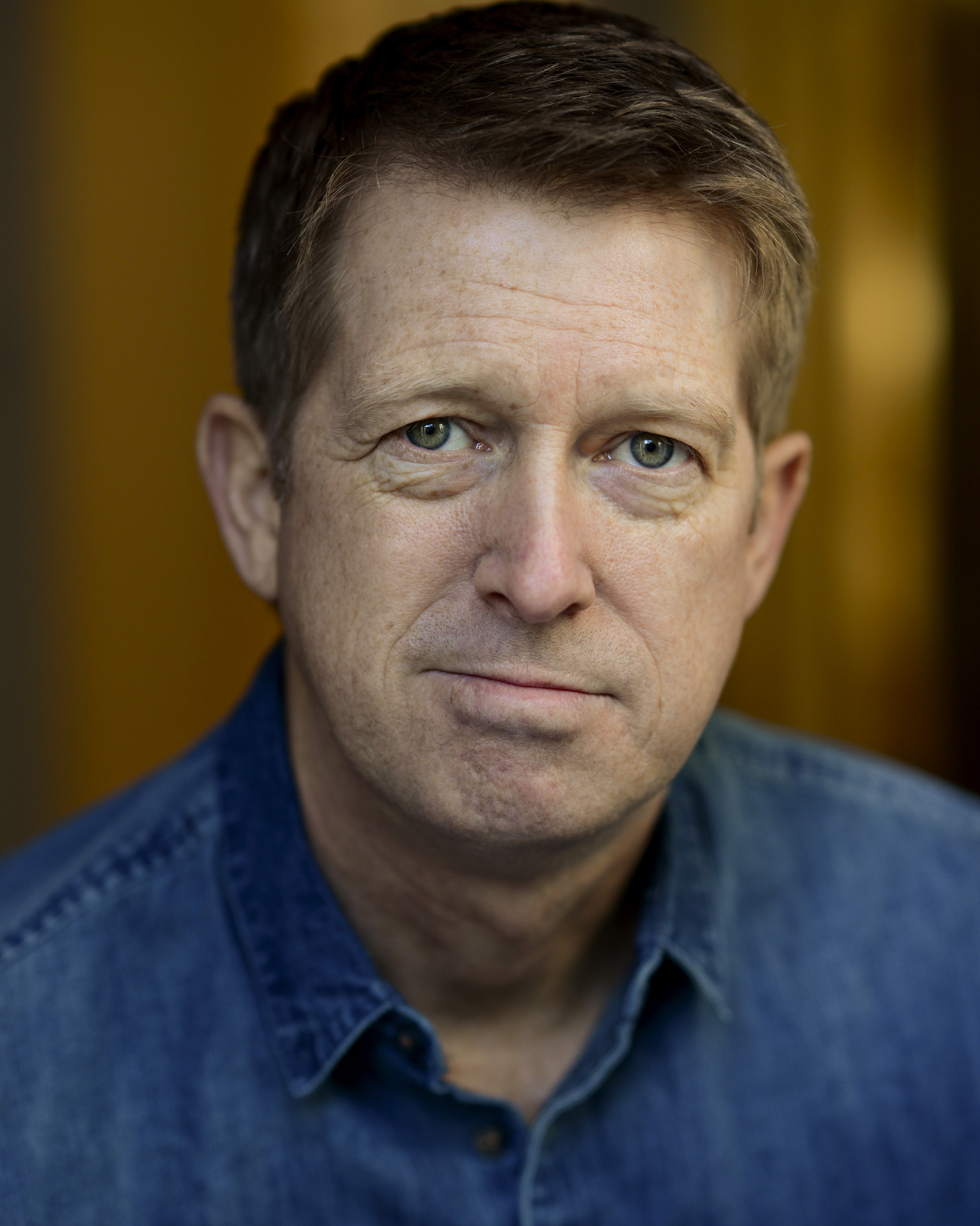
- Born: 12 April 1965 (age 61); Newport Pagnell, Buckinghamshire, England
- Occupations: Actor, Voice actor
- Website: Official website

Ian Porter (born April 12, 1965, in Newport Pagnell, UK) is an English actor.

== Early career ==
Ian Porter's family hails from Coventry, but his family moved to Los Angeles when he was only 1 year old. He lived in Torrance, California until he graduated from Long Beach State University. He has been living and working in Britain since 1988.

== Theatre ==
- Justin Moskova and Albert Palmer in Rare Earth Mettle at the Royal Court Theatre
- Sheriff Talbott in Orpheus Descending at the Menier Chocolate Factory / Theatre Clwyd
- Hershey Green in Desperate Measures at Clerkenwell Prison
- Buzzy Banks in The Trial of Jane Fonda at The Assembly Rooms, Edinburgh
- Bill Ray in On Golden Pond at the Salisbury Playhouse
- Boolie in Driving Miss Daisy UK tour 2012 (starring Gwen Taylor and Don Warrington)
- Slim in Of Mice And Men at the Watermill Theatre
- Company member in August:Osage County at the National Theatre
- You Can’t Take It With You and The Archbishop’s Ceiling at Southwark Playhouse
- Road to Nirvana at the King's Head
- Voices From September 11 at the Old Vic
- Danny Bouncing and The Glass Menagerie at Derby Playhouse
- Sideman and Burning Blue in the West End
- All My Sons at Bristol Old Vic
- Crimes of the Heart at The Man in the Moon Theatre.

== Filmography ==
=== Film ===
Year	Title	Role	Notes
1995	The Steal	Beggar	
1998	Saving Private Ryan	Trask	
2001	Spy Game	US Reporter	
2004	The Defender	Newell	
2005	The Jacket	Major	
2006	Alien Autopsy	Pentagon Officer	
2006	Dark Corners	News Anchor	
2007	Mr Bean’s Holiday	Newsreader	
2007	Finding Rin Tin Tin	Lieutenant Bryant	
2010	Gulliver’s Travels	Business Desk Editor	
2015	Survivors	Concierge #2	
2016	Angel of Decay	Hergesheimer	
2018	The Negotiator	Jerry	
2019	Dumbo	Cavendish	Uncredited
2019	Angel Has Fallen	Fox Reporter	
2021	The King's Man	American General	
2021	The Phantom of the Open	Dick Nelson	
2023	The Unlikely Pilgrimage of Harold Fry	Jim	

=== Television ===
Year	Title	Role	Notes
1996	Strange but True?	Reconstruction Cast	
2005	Timewatch	Walter C. Langer	
2005–2010	I Shouldn't Be Alive	Roy Davidson / Mark Sorensen	
2006	Hotel Babylon	Mr. Pullins	
2006	The Wild West	Pat Garrett	
2007	Doctor Who	Hybrid / Foreman	
2008	Banged Up Abroad	Mark Ross	
2008	Bonekickers	George Washington	
2008	Moonshot	Bill Anders	
2009	The Execution of Gary Glitter	Reverend David Sanders	
2011	Grenadine & Mentalo	Various (Voice)	Season 1, episode 1 & 15
2013	Nixon's the One	Richard Helms	Season 1, episode 2
2014	24: Live Another Day	Submarine Captain McColl	
2014	Utopia	Scientist	
2015	The Eichmann Show	Male Journalist	
2015	Obsession: Dark Desires	Narrator	
2015	Serial Thriller	Hergesheimer	Season 1, episode 1 & 2
2015	You, Me and the Apocalypse	Homeland Spokesman	Season 1, episode 3
2016	The Crown	U.S. Department Aide	Season 1, episode 7
2017	I Live with Models	Pete	Season 2, episode 6
2018	Bliss	Jess Gardner	Season 1, episode 2
2018	Ransom	Joe Hearst	Season 2, episode 7
2018	Patriot	McMillan Competitor	Season 2, episode 8
2018–2019	Someone You Thought You Knew	Mark Porter	
2019	Living the Dream	Milton Welch	Season 2, episode 2
2020	Terms & Conditions	Richard ‘Sweet’ Mud	Season 1, episode 5
2020	5-Star Weekend	Fred (voice)	Season 1, episode 3
2022	FBI: International	Dettman	Season 1, episode 12
2024	Last to Brake	Bob Haze	Season 1, episodes 1–6
2025	Lockerbie: A Search for Truth	Brian Murtagh	Season 2, episode 1, 3 & 4
2026	Marble Hall Murders	Harrison Carter	Episode 4

=== Video Games ===
Year	Title	Role	Notes
2023	The Talos Principle 2	Alcatraz	

== Radio ==
The Women's Room, Valley of the Dolls, Cruel Sunset, Gunned Down, One of Ours and 1000 Acres.
