= Moonflower Murders =

Novel by Anthony Horowitz

- First edition
- Author: Anthony Horowitz
- Language: English
- Series: Susan Ryeland
- Genre: Mystery fiction
- Published: 2020
- Publisher: Harper
- Publication place: United Kingdom
- Media type: Print (hardback, paperback) ebook, audiobook
- Pages: 608 pages
- ISBN: 978-0-06-295545-6
- Preceded by: Magpie Murders
- Followed by: Marble Hall Murders

Moonflower Murders is a 2020 mystery novel by British author Anthony Horowitz and the second novel in the Susan Ryeland series. The story focuses on the disappearance of a hotel employee and uses a story within a story format.

The novel received strong positive reviews for its many-layered plot and brisk pace of the prose, “meaning that what we are reading can literally be described as a mystery wrapped in an enigma”. It was termed “a flawless update of classic golden age whodunits”.

== Plot summary ==
Susan Ryeland, running a struggling hotel in Crete with her fiancé Andreas, is approached by Lawrence and Pauline Treherne, owners of Branlow Hall, a hotel in England. The Trehernes explain that a murder occurred eight years earlier at their hotel. Susan's former client, author Alan Conway, used the events as the basis for his mystery novel Atticus Pünd Takes the Case.

The Trehernes' daughter Cecily called her parents after reading the book, telling them that the book proves that the man in jail for the murder, Stefan Codrescu, is innocent. Shortly after that phone call, Cecily disappeared. Susan accepts an offer of ten thousand pounds to return to England, stay at their hotel, and use any insight she may have gained by editing the book to find Cecily and the true killer of Frank Parris.

Susan analyzes the novel closely and uncovers both the true killer of eight years earlier and where Cecily is. In a meeting at Branlow Hall Hotel, with the Treherne family and the police detective, Susan reveals the murderer as Cecily's husband, Aiden. Aiden had previously been a sex worker and had left this life after meeting Cecily, whom he had married not out of love but because of their home and his job at the hotel. When Frank Parris stayed at the hotel, he attempted to blackmail Aiden about his past. Aiden murdered Parris, and when Cecily discovered what Aiden had done, he murdered her as well. Aiden framed Stefan because Cecily had an affair with him that produced her daughter.

Soon after confessing every detail, Aiden escapes the police detective and commits suicide by jumping in front of a train.

The novel also contains the complete text of Atticus Pünd Takes the Case, and readers can see where the fictional author Conway left clues throughout pointing to the "real-life" crime.

== Reception ==
Michael Dirda writing in The Washington Post calls this novel one of the “metafictional mysteries” by Horowitz. The plot is complex while the writing moves at a brisk pace. The structure of this literal “novel within a novel” is presented clearly in the review, indicating one aspect of complexity of the plot.

Publishers Weekly considered it “a flawless update of classic golden age whodunits.”

Kirkus Reviews noted all the same features of the complex plot and clear prose, yet felt it was “over the top”: “The novel within a novel is so extensive and absorbing on its own, in fact, that all but the brainiest armchair detectives are likely to find it a serious distraction from the mystery to which it’s supposed to offer the key.“

Sarah Lyall, writing in The New York Times, considered it a classic golden-age mystery novel, with a modern or postmodern take, and was impressed by the continual flow of high-quality writing from the author. This novel was “a richly plotted, head-spinning novel about a present-day disappearance, a murder eight years earlier and a fictional murder that may be relevant to both.”

== Television adaptation ==
In 2023, the BBC began filming a series based on Moonflower Murders that was released in 2024. Lesley Manville and Timothy McMullan reprised their roles as Susan and Atticus from the previous Magpie Murders series.
