= Kiss of Life (2003 film) =

2003 film

- Film poster
- Directed by: Emily Young
- Written by: Emily Young
- Produced by: Gayle Griffiths
- Starring: Ingeborga Dapkunaite
- Cinematography: Wojciech Szepel
- Edited by: David Charap
- Production companies: Film Council; BBC Films; France 3 Cinema; Gimages Films; Sofica Gimages 6 Baker Street Media Finance; Take Five; Wild Horses Films; Haut et Court; Autonomous
- Distributed by: Haut et Court (France); Artificial Eye (United Kingdom)
- Release date: 21 May 2003
- Running time: 100 minutes
- Countries: United Kingdom; France
- Language: English

Kiss of Life (working title Helen of Peckham) is a 2003 drama film. It is the debut feature film by director Emily Young.

== Plot ==
Helen lives in London with her father and her children, but is suddenly killed in a car accident. Aid worker John is trying desperately to get back to his family from Bosnian war, unaware that his wife is dead. Helen, also unaware that she is dead, hovers in limbo, until finally she is released.

== Cast ==
- Ingeborga Dapkūnaitė – Helen
- Peter Mullan – John
- David Warner – Pap
- Millie Findlay – Kate
- James E. Martin – Telly
- Ivan Bijuk – Old Man
- Sonnell Dadral – Rajiv
- Natalie Dew – Nicky
- Gemma Jones – Sonia
- Elizabeth Powell – Little Kate
- Marinko Prga – Mercedes Driver
- Barbara Rocco – Woman in Bar
- Dragica Sreckovic – Old Woman
- Davor Svedruzic – Angry Soldier
- Heather Tobias – Teacher
- Rosie Wiggins – Nadine
- Ivan Zadro – Depot Worker (as Ivica Zadro)
- Ranko Zidaric – Depot Boss

== Production ==
The film, an English attempt at socialist realist drama in the style of Polish director Krzysztof Kieślowski, is Young's debut feature film as director. Set in the Peckham district of London, it was originally titled Helen of Peckham.

Lithuanian actor Ingeborga Dapkūnaitė stepped in to play Helen at short notice, after the actor originally booked to play the role, Katrin Cartlidge, died suddenly in 2002, two weeks before production was scheduled to begin.

== Release ==
Kiss of Life was screened in the Un Certain Regard section at the 2003 Cannes Film Festival.

== Reception ==
Film critic and historian Robert Murphy praised the cast for "an impressively convincing performance", and wrote that Young "deserves credit for telling her story through images rather than dialogue, and dealing intelligently with death, memory, and love".

The film was nominated for several awards, winning the Carl Foreman Award for Most Promising Newcomer at the 2004 BAFTAs.
