= Moonflower Murders (TV series) =

British television series

- Genre: Murder mystery
- Created by: Anthony Horowitz
- Based on: Moonflower Murders by Anthony Horowitz
- Written by: Anthony Horowitz
- Directed by: Rebecca Gatward
- Starring: Lesley Manville; Timothy McMullan
- Theme music composer: Murray Gold
- Countries of origin: United Kingdom; United States
- Original language: English
- No. of episodes: 6

Production
- Executive producers: Suzanne Simpson; Lesley Manville; Rebecca Gatward; Suzanne McAuley; Jill Green; Anthony Horowitz
- Producer: Suzanne McAuley
- Cinematography: Peter Robertson
- Editor: Catherine Creed
- Production companies: BBC Studios; Eleventh Hour Films; Masterpiece

Original release
- Network: BBC One (United Kingdom)
- Release: 16 November – 14 December 2024
- Network: PBS (United States)
- Release: 15 September – 20 October 2024

Related
- Magpie Murders; Marble Hall Murders

Moonflower Murders is a 2024 murder mystery television series that is an adaptation of the novel of the same name by British author Anthony Horowitz and the second novel in the Susan Ryeland series. The numerous through-line plot elements make the series a continuation of the Magpie Murders series.

== Cast and characters ==
- Lesley Manville as Susan Ryeland
- Timothy McMullan as Atticus Pünd
- Alexandros Logothetis as Andreas Patakis
- Daniel Mays as Locke / Chubb
- Pooky Quesnel as Pauline Treherne / Maureen Gardner
- Claire Rushbrook as Katie Williams
- Conleth Hill as Alan Conway
- Matthew Beard as James Taylor
- Sanjeev Kohli as Sajid Khan
- Mark Gatiss as Frank Parris / Oskar Berlin
- Rosalie Craig as Lisa Treherne / Melissa James
- Pippa Bennett-Warner as Madeline Cain
- Adrian Rawlins as Lawrence Treherne / Lance Gardner
- Liam Garrigan as Dr Leonard Collins
- Jeany Spark as Samantha Collins
- Kostis Daskalakis as Vangelis
- Alec Secareanu as Stefan Leonida
- Will Tudor as Aiden MacNeil / Algernon Marsh
- Amy Griffiths as Cecily MacNeil née Treherne
- Rupert Evans as John Spencer
- Wade Briggs as Liam Corby
- Joanna Bacon as Gwyneth Endicott / Phyllis Chandler
- Thomas Coombes as Derek Endicott / Eric Chandler
- Tim Plester as Martin Webster
- Kate Ashfield as Joanne Webster

== Production ==
In January 2023, the series was bought by BBC One from BritBox. The BBC then developed plans to produce a sequel series to Magpie Murders. Author Anthony Horowitz adapted his book for the series himself, which is directed by Rebecca Gatward. The six-part series is produced by Eleventh Hour Films and executive produced by Jill Green, and made in association with PBS’s Masterpiece, for whom the first series attracted over five million viewers.

In 2023, the BBC began filming a series based on Moonflower Murders, released in 2024. Lesley Manville and Timothy McMullan reprised their roles as Susan and Atticus from the previous Magpie Murders series. The series features new cast members including Mark Gatiss, Rosalie Craig, Pippa Bennett-Warner and Adrian Rawlins, as well as returning roles for Alexandros Logothetis, Daniel Mays, Claire Rushbrook, Conleth Hill, Matthew Beard and Sanjeev Kohli.

Filming was completed by December 2023, with filming locations including Dublin and Crete.

== Episodes ==
No.	Title	Directed by	Written by	U.K. airdate (Note: All six episodes were released on BBC iPlayer on 16 November 2024)	U.S. airdate
1	"Episode 1"	Rebecca Gatward	Anthony Horowitz	16 November 2024	15 September 2024
2	"Episode 2"	Rebecca Gatward	Anthony Horowitz	16 November 2024	22 September 2024
3	"Episode 3"	Rebecca Gatward	Anthony Horowitz	23 November 2024	29 September 2024
4	"Episode 4"	Rebecca Gatward	Anthony Horowitz	30 November 2024	6 October 2024
5	"Episode 5"	Rebecca Gatward	Anthony Horowitz	7 December 2024	13 October 2024
6	"Episode 6"	Rebecca Gatward	Anthony Horowitz	14 December 2024	20 October 2024

== Broadcast ==
The series was broadcast in the US on Masterpiece on 15 September 2024, and on BBC One and BBC iPlayer in the United Kingdom on 16 November 2024.

== Reception ==
The review aggregator website Rotten Tomatoes reported a 100% approval rating.

Rachel Cooke in The New Statesman described the series as a "superb and highly intricate homage to Golden Age crime fiction". Vicky Jessop in the Evening Standard said that the series was a "fabulously multi-layered story [that] takes all the conventions of the genre and twists them in ways that makes every cliché feel fresh again". Anita Singh The Daily Telegraph gave a less positive review, conceding that it "has all the Horowitz ingredients – clever plotting, sprightly dialogue, nice flashes of humour and an appealing lead" with "nothing to dislike, it just over-eggs the pudding. Having watched six episodes in the series, I can’t decide whether the denouement is satisfying or silly".
