= Helen Mason (journalist) =

Helen Mason Young (1938 in Glasgow, Scotland – 1989 in London, UK) was a journalist and children's author.

She gave up a journalistic career with the Daily Express after she married the political journalist Hugo Young and decided care for her four children. As they grew older, she began to return to paid work. She completed a number of successful children's books under her married name, Helen Young, including Wide Awake Jake, A Throne for Sesame and What Difference Does it Make, Danny? whose target age-groups grew along with her own children.

Eventually she resumed her journalism as a freelance columnist on a number of newspapers, such as The Observer and The Sunday Times. As a journalist she was usually credited under her maiden name Helen Mason, and occasionally other pseudonyms to protect her children from the embarrassment of being identified by their friends with some of her more personal observations about them.
