= Tim McMullan =

English actor

- Education: Royal Academy of Dramatic Arts; University of St. Andrews
- Occupation: Actor

Timothy W. V. McMullan (born 1963) is a British actor, notable for his stage, television and film work. He is best known for playing Atticus Pünd in the BBC mystery dramas Magpie Murders, Moonflower Murders and Marble Hall Murders.

== Career ==
McMullan's stage work includes a 2008 adaptation of The Misanthrope alongside Damian Lewis and Keira Knightley along with the 2003 adaptation of His Dark Materials. In 2009 he was in Dominic Dromgoole's Shakespeare's Globe production of As You Like It and worked for Complicité. In 2016, again for Dromgoole, he was Prospero in The Tempest at the Sam Wanamaker Playhouse.

In 2017 McMullan played Sir Toby Belch in a production of Twelfth Night on the Olivier stage at the Royal National Theatre.

In July 2020 Deadline announced that PBS' Masterpiece would adapt Anthony Horowitz's Magpie Murders novel into a six-part drama series and air it in the US, and on BritBox in the UK. Horowitz prepared the script and Masterpiece produced the series along with Jill Green and Eleventh Hour Films. McMullan was signed to portray the character of Atticus Pünd after actor Timothy Spall pulled out of the production due to scheduling issues.

== Filmography ==
Year	Title	Role	Notes
1993	Shadowlands	Nick Farrell	
1994	Being Human	Deserter	
1995	Princess Caraboo	Light Fingered Aristocrat	
1995	Complicite: The Three Lives of Lucie Cabrol	Henri Cabrol	
1997	The Fifth Element	Scientist's Aide	
1997	Robinson Crusoe	Crusoe's Second	
1997	Caught in the Act	Pip	
1998	Dangerous Beauty	Zealot	
1998	Shakespeare in Love	Frees	
1999	Plunkett & Macleane	Bridegroom	
1999	Onegin	Dandy 1	
2000	Eisenstein	Rak	
2002	Two Men Went to War	Military Policeman on train	
2006	The Queen	Stephen Lamport	
2010	Shakespeare's Globe: As You Like It	Jaques	
2011	National Theatre Live: The Cherry Orchard	Siminov-Pischik	
2012	The Woman in Black	Mr. Jerome	
2015	National Theatre Live: Man and Superman	Mendoza / The Devil	
2017	National Theatre Live: Twelfth Night	Sir Toby Belch	
2017	Victoria & Abdul	Tailor	
2018	Willy and the Guardians of the Lake	King	Voice (UK version)
2018	National Theatre Live: Antony & Cleopatra	Enobarbus	
2019	Vic the Viking and the Magic Sword	Sven	Voice
2021	Cyrano	Jodelet	
2022	Enola Holmes 2	Charles McIntyre	
2025	Fackham Hall	Cyril	

=== Television ===
Year	Title	Role	Notes
1993	Stalag Luft	Donaldson	Television film
1994	The Wimbledon Poisoner	Sebastian Williams	2 episodes
1995	Performance	Sir Walter Blunt	Episode: "Henry IV"
1998	Heat of the Sun	Franz-Dietrich Gessler	Episode: "Private Lives"
2002	Surrealissimo: The Scandalous Success of Salvador Dali	Press Man	Television film
2004	Agatha Christie: A Life in Pictures	Pharmacist	Television film
2006	Pinochet's Last Stand	Di Parfrey	Television film
2007	Trial & Retribution	Brooks	2 episodes
2008	Sense and Sensibility	Mr Palmer	2 episodes
2008	Mutual Friends	Consultant	Episode #1.4
2009	Margaret	William Waldegrave	Television film
2010	The Great Outdoors	Farmer	Episode #1.2
2010	Devil in the Fog	Mr Treet	2 episodes
2012	Silk	Judge Hoyle	Episode #2.2
2012	The Hollow Crown	Silence	Episode: "Henry IV, Part 2"
2012	Parade's End	Stephen Waterhouse	2 episodes
2013	Elementary	DCI Hopkins	Episode: "Step Nine"
2013	Fifty Years on Stage	Flagg	Television film
2013–2015	Foyle's War	Arthur Valentine	6 episodes
2014	Endeavour	Brian Quinbury	Episode: "Sway"
2015	The Go-Between	Butler	Television film
2016	Grantchester	Professor Raban	Episode #2.2
2016	Doctor Thorne	Earl de Courcy	4 episodes
2016	The Witness for the Prosecution	Hugo Meredith	2 episodes
2017	King Charles III	James Reiss	Television film
2017	Fearless	David Nolenn	2 episodes
2018	Patrick Melrose	Sonny Gravesend	Episode: "Some Hope"
2019	Brexit: The Uncivil War	Bernard Jenkin	Television film
2019	The Crown	Robin Woods	Episode: "Moondust"
2021	The Serpent	Douglas Cartwright	2 episodes
2022	Magpie Murders	Atticus Pünd	6 episodes
2024	Moonflower Murders	Atticus Pünd	6 episodes
2026	Death in Paradise	Richard Dempster	Series 15, Episode 5
2026	Marble Hall Murders	Atticus Pünd	Six-part series
