= Veronika Decides to Die =

Novel by Paulo Coelho

- First edition cover
- Author: Paulo Coelho
- Original title: Veronika Decide Morrer
- Cover artist: Hieronymus Bosch, "Cutting the Stone", c. 1494
- Language: Portuguese
- Publication date: 1998
- Publication place: Brazil
- Media type: Print (Hardcover, Paperback)
- Pages: 210 pages (Paperback)
- ISBN: 0-06-095577-5
- OCLC: 47204184

Veronika Decides to Die (Portuguese: Veronika Decide Morrer) is a novel by Paulo Coelho. It tells the story of Veronika, a 24-year-old Slovenian who appears to have everything in life going for her, but who decides to kill herself. This book is partly based on Coelho's experience in various mental institutions (see the biography Confessions of a Pilgrim by Juan Arias), and deals with the subject of madness. The gist of the message is that "collective madness is called sanity".

== Plot summary ==
Veronika is a young woman from Ljubljana, Slovenia, who appears to have a perfect life, but nevertheless decides to take her own life by overdosing with sleeping pills. While she waits to die, she cancels the suicide letter she starts to her parents while suddenly provoked by a magazine article.

The magazine article wittily asks "Where is Slovenia?", so she writes a letter to the press justifying her suicide, the idea is to make the press believe that she has killed herself because people don't even know where Slovenia is. Her plan fails and she wakes up from the coma in Villette, a mental hospital in Slovenia, where she is told she has only a few days to live due to heart condition caused by the overdose.

Her presence there affects all of the mental hospital's patients, especially Zedka, who has clinical depression; Mari, who has panic attacks; and Eduard, who has schizophrenia, and with whom Veronika falls in love. During her internment in Villette she realizes that she has nothing to lose and can, therefore, do what she wants, say what she wants and be who she wants without having to worry about what others think of her; as a mental patient, she is unlikely to be criticized. Because of this new-found freedom, Veronika experiences all the things she never allowed herself to experience, including hatred and love.

In the end it is found that Dr. Igor has repeatedly injected a drug called Fenotal into her to stimulate heart attaks in a drastic attempt and provocative experiment to see if you can "shock" someone into wanting to live by convincing her that death is imminent? Like a doctor applying defibrillator paddles to a heart attack victim, Dr. Igor's "prognosis" jump-starts Veronika's new appreciation of the world around her.
