= Kate Gilmore (actress) =

Contemporary Irish actress

Kate Gilmore is a stage and television actress from Artane, Dublin best known for playing Karen O'Neill in RTÉ One's Fair City. She played Lucy in the two series of Striking Out in 2017 and 2018.

In 2012 Gilmore participated in the first series of The Voice of Ireland as part of Bressie's team, before being eliminated at the "battles" stage. She graduated from the Gaiety School of Acting in 2013. In 2015, she won an Irish Times Theatre Award for Best Supporting Actress. In 2016 she starred with Sam Keeley in The Nation Holds Its Breath, a short film directed by Kev Cahill.

In 2021, she wrote and starred in Someday Sadie a short film about her relative a up-and-coming singer whose career was cut short by an unplanned pregnancy.

In 2024 Gilmore played the Actress in a Gate Theatre-Sydney Theatre Company co-production of Thomas Bernhard's The President starring Hugo Weaving, in both Dublin, and Sydney.

She is an only child.
