= Magpie Murders =

Novel by Anthony Horowitz

- Cover for Orion release
- Author: Anthony Horowitz
- Audio read by: Allan Corduner; Samantha Bond
- Language: English
- Series: Susan Ryeland
- Genre: Mystery fiction
- Published: 2016
- Publisher: Orion
- Publication place: United Kingdom
- Media type: Print (hardback, paperback) ebook, audiobook
- Pages: 560 pages
- ISBN: 1409158365 First edition hardback, UK
- Followed by: Moonflower Murders

Magpie Murders is a 2016 mystery novel by British author Anthony Horowitz and the first novel in the Susan Ryeland series. The story focuses on the murder of a mystery author and uses a story within a story format.

The book has been translated into several languages and has been adapted into a six-part television drama series with the same title. Horowitz has followed the book with two additional entries in the Susan Ryeland series, Moonflower Murders and Marble Hall Murders. He has expressed interest in a potential fourth entry, Mile End Murders.

== Plot summary ==
There are two plots in this novel. One is the Atticus Pünd mystery novel written by fictional author Alan Conway; the other details publishing editor Susan Ryeland's search for the missing final chapter of the novel, as well as her investigation into the death of Conway.

=== Novel by "Alan Conway" ===
In 1955, Mary Blakiston, housekeeper at Pye Hall in Saxby-on-Avon, is found dead at the bottom of the stairs. Villagers suspect Mary's son Robert is the murderer. The next day, newspapers report the murder of Sir Magnus Pye. Famed detective Atticus Pünd and his assistant James Fraser travel to the Hall, where they are greeted by Detective Inspector Chubb.

Investigation at the home of Sir Magnus reveals various motives for the family members to have committed the murder, along with clues typical of the genre.

Pünd reveals the murderer of Sir Magnus as Robert. Robert had murdered his brother Tom and his brother's dog Bella 12 years earlier. Mary was aware of Robert's guilt and feared her remaining son would pass on his homicidal tendencies to any potential children. She wrote a letter for Sir Magnus in the event of her death by suspicious circumstances and told Robert that she did this. Mary's death was purely accidental. After reading the letter, Sir Magnus confronted Robert, who killed him and burned the letter written by his mother. After hearing Pünd's recital of the case, Inspector Chubb arrests Robert for the murder of Sir Magnus Pye.

A subplot details that Pünd is suffering from a brain tumour; he eventually commits suicide.

=== Susan Ryeland investigates ===
Susan Ryeland, an editor for Cloverleaf Books, is about to read Magpie Murders, the newest novel in Alan Conway's Atticus Pünd series. Susan finds the last chapter is missing, resulting in a whodunit with no solution. She learns from the evening news that Alan Conway is dead. The next day, her boss Charles Clover shows her a letter from Alan Conway, suggesting suicide.

Susan goes to Alan's home village to look for the last chapter. She becomes convinced that someone murdered Alan and begins investigating. Through her investigation, she learns that Conway hated the mystery genre that had made him successful, preferring to write pretentious literature. After attending Alan's funeral, Susan makes a list of potential murderers of Conway.

Charles offers Susan the job as head of Cloverleaf Books as he is retiring. At the same time, her boyfriend Andreas asks her to move to Crete with him to run a hotel there.

At the office of Cloverleaf Books, Susan finds the last chapter on paper. It is revealed that Charles learned Alan planned nine novels, the first letters of the titles of which spelled out "an anagram". The anagram it refers to is of the name "Atticus Pünd", whose letters can be rearranged to "a stupid cunt", reflecting Alan's hatred of the character and of mysteries generally. As Alan was about to reveal this to the public, Charles killed him to prevent it and used a page from the final chapter as the fake suicide note.

After confronting her boss, Susan tries to leave, but Charles knocks her out and sets the office on fire. Andreas saves Susan and the last chapter.

The completed book is published by another firm, because Cloverleaf Books is dissolved after Charles is arrested for murder. When Susan is sufficiently recovered, she goes to Crete with Andreas to run the hotel.

== Development ==
Horowitz first developed the concept of Magpie Murders during the first season of Midsomer Murders, which premiered in 1997. He has stated that he wanted the novel to "be more than just a murder mystery story" and to be "a sort of a treatise on the whole genre of murder mystery writing. How the writers come up with the ideas; how these books are formed."

== Publication history ==
Magpie Murders was first released in hardback and e-book format in the United Kingdom on 6 October 2016 through Orion. An audiobook adaptation narrated by Allan Corduner and Samantha Bond was simultaneously released through Orion and BrillianceAudio. The novel was given a release in the United States the following year through HarperCollins and HarperAudio in hardback, e-book, and audiobook format. Paperback editions were released in the United Kingdom in 2017 and the United States in 2018.

In the following years, the novel has been published in several languages, including Korean and Japanese (2018, through The Open Books (열린책들) and 東京創元社, respectively), as well as Chinese and German (2019, 新星出版社 and Berlin Insel Verlag, respectively).

== Reception ==
It was reviewed by The New York Times and Time magazine, the latter of which called it the "thinking mystery fan’s ideal summer thriller."

USA Today, the Washington Times and the Guardian praised the novel's characters, accurate imitation of the Golden Age mystery formula, and the use of the story within a story, though the Washington Times noted that this device sometimes made the plot difficult to follow.

== Adaptation ==
In July 2020, Deadline announced that PBS's Masterpiece would adapt the novel into a six-part drama series, which would be aired in the US and on BritBox in the UK. The series, which shares the same name as the novel, starred Lesley Manville and Tim McMullan as Susan Ryeland and Atticus Pünd, respectively. Magpie Murders began streaming in the United Kingdom via BritBox on 10 February 2022; in North America, the PBS series premiered on 16 October 2022. On Rotten Tomatoes the series has a 100% rating based on reviews from 12 critics, with an average rating of 8 out of 10.

The adaptation aired on BBC One on 1 April 2023 and released all episodes on BBC iPlayer, but aired the six episodes each week on BBC One. A sequel, Moonflower Murders, adapted from the novel of the same name and also starring Manville, was broadcast in 2024. An adaptation of the third and final entry in the series, Marble Hall Murders, has been confirmed as in production; filming is expected to take place in London, Dublin, and Corfu.
