= Alex Rider =

Alex Rider may refer to:

- Alex Rider (book series), a young kids spy novel series by Anthony Horowitz
- Alex Rider (character), the protagonist of the eponymous series
- Alex Rider: Stormbreaker (video game), a video game released in conjunction with the 2006 film Stormbreaker
- Alex Rider (TV series), an Amazon Prime television adaptation of the novel series
