= Stormbreaker =

Stormbreaker may refer to:

== Books ==
- Stormbreaker (novel), a 2000 novel by Anthony Horowitz
  - Stormbreaker (film), a 2006 film based on the novel
  - Stormbreaker: The Graphic Novel, a 2005 graphic novel based on the novel
  - Alex Rider: Stormbreaker, a 2006 video game based on the film

== Comics ==
- Stormbreaker (comics), a fictional hammer in the Marvel Comics wielded by Beta Ray Bill
  - Stormbreaker (Marvel Cinematic Universe), the film counterpart wielded by Thor
  - Stormbreaker: The Saga of Beta Ray Bill, a Marvel Comics miniseries

== Other uses ==
- Stormbreaker (album), a 2008 album by John Power
- GBU-53/B StormBreaker, an American precision-guided glide bomb
