= Alex Rider (character) =

Character of Alex Rider novel

- Alex Rider character
- Alex Rider, as portrayed by Otto Farrant in the television series of the same name.
- First appearance: Stormbreaker (2000)
- Last appearance: Nightshade Revenge (2023)
- Created by: Anthony Horowitz
- Portrayed by: Alex Pettyfer (Stormbreaker film); Otto Farrant (TV series)

In-universe information
- Aliases: Felix Lester, Kevin Blake, Alex Friend, Alex Gardiner, Federico Casali, Abdul Hassan, Alex Brenner, Alex Tanner
- Species: Human
- Gender: Male
- Occupation: Student; Spy for MI6 Operations
- Family: John Rider (father, deceased), Helen Beckett (mother, deceased), Ian Rider (uncle, deceased), Jack Starbright (guardian)
- Birthdate: 13 February 1987 (novels)

Alexander Rider is a title character and the protagonist of the Alex Rider novel series by British author Anthony Horowitz. He has also been featured in three short stories written by Horowitz based in the same canon as the series; Secret Weapon, Christmas at Gunpoint and Incident in Nice.

Alex is a boy who works for MI6, the British international intelligence service. When fourteen years old, Alex was forced into this occupation after MI6 noticed Alex's many talents. He has not only worked for MI6, but also the CIA, SCORPIA (in Scorpia), and the Australian Secret Intelligence Service (in Snakehead). In the film adaption of Stormbreaker, Alex Rider was portrayed by Alex Pettyfer, and in the Amazon Prime TV series, he is portrayed by Otto Farrant.

== Development ==
Horowitz came up with the idea for the series when he thought about creating a teenage equivalent of James Bond.

He initially considered several possible names for the character before finally settling on Alex Rider. Rider's last name comes from the Bond girl Honeychile Rider from the novel Dr. No.

Alex was originally to have had dark hair, but after Horowitz saw several surveys that said teenage girls preferred blonde boys, he created him as fair haired instead.

== About the character ==
Alex was born on February 13, 1987. The book series originally happens during 2001, making him fourteen. Before Alex became involved with MI6, he wanted to be a professional football player, but now is unsure of what he wants to do when he finishes school. Alex once joked that he wanted to be a train driver. He has stated many times that he is not interested in becoming a full-time MI6 agent.

Alex's athletic talents greatly assist him during his missions many times: for example, in Point Blanc he snowboards down a mountain on an ironing board to escape Point Blanc Academy, in Skeleton Key he scuba dives into Skeleton Key, in Scorpia he BASE jumps into a factory, in Ark Angel he walks between two apartment buildings on a tightrope and in Snakehead, he kayaks down a river on a makeshift kayak.

As the series progresses, Alex becomes more skilled at spying. He later pursues Damian Cray alone after MI6 refuse to investigate him, and is recruited by the CIA in the United States, and later by the ASIS in Australia although in each case only for specific missions.

== Physical appearance ==
Alex is described as a boy with 'the body of an athlete'. He also has fair blonde hair and 'serious dark eyes', and weighs 110 pounds. He is also said to attract many girls.

== Relationships ==
=== Jack Starbright ===
One of Alex's closest friends is Jack Starbright. With his uncle having been away on secret missions for MI6 much of the time, Alex has spent a lot of time with Jack. Alex met Jack when she came from the United States to study law in London, and being employed by his uncle as a housekeeper and to watch over Alex, who was seven years old at the time. She has known Alex for seven years. After Ian died, Jack became Alex's guardian. Even though it was originally her job to care for Alex, they have grown attached and their relationship has become very personal. However, as Alex's MI6 life starts to take a toll on him, it also places somewhat of a strain on their relationship - Jack is always very worried and upset that Alex's life is constantly being put in danger. In Scorpia Rising, Jack learns that her father is sick and needs someone to look after him. Jack decides that she needs to tell Alex that she must leave in order to care for her father, but she first decides to accompany Alex to Egypt for his mission. After the two are captured by Razim's men, Jack comes to experience, for the first time, what it has been like for Alex on a mission. She attempts to escape, and nearly succeeds, but Razim is merely using her for his "measurement of pain" experiment, and has Julius Grief detonate a bomb on the Land Rover she is driving, killing her instantly. Alex's grief is enough to cause him to black out, and Razim "may even have to create a second scale of measurement" for the amount of emotional pain Alex felt. However, Jack is revealed to be alive in the following novel Never Say Die, as her death was faked by other members of Scorpia as part of their plans to set up a complex hostage situation involving taking a school bus of wealthy children prisoner, with Alex eventually managing to rescue her.

=== Sabina Pleasure ===
Throughout the novels, Sabina Pleasure becomes one of Alex's closest friends. The two first met while working as ball boys/girls at the Wimbledon Tennis Championships and they quickly became good friends. Sabina soon became suspicious when Alex had to leave the Championships early, and more so when Sabina saved Alex's life, and Alex then disappears on a mission for several weeks. Alex's constant disappearances place a real difficulty on their relationship, and when Sabina finally finds out the truth about Alex, things turn out differently for them. Alex's relationship with Sabina takes a turn during their first holiday in Cornwall, when the two share a slight kiss one night. The next day they went out for a surfing trip, when Alex is knocked out by a massive wave and Sabina gives him CPR. Sabina soon leaves Britain to live in the United States. Although Alex suspects he will never see her again, she later sends him a card when Alex is in the hospital after being shot by a sniper. She shows up at the end of Snakehead to have dinner with him. She then invites him to celebrate New Year with her family in Scotland, where the plot of Crocodile Tears begins and also shares another kiss with him, hinting that her feelings for him may still exist. In Scorpia Rising, Alex and Sabina are revealed to be in a relationship, and struggling with the long distance between them. At the end of the book, after the apparent death of Jack while on a mission in Egypt, Sabina's family become his new legal guardians. By the start of Never Say Die, Alex and Sabina remain friends, but are no longer a couple as Sabina is now interested in a basketball player at her new school; in Nightshade Revenge, Sabina tells Alex that her family is moving back to London and she was never actually involved with the basketball player, implying that she wants to get back together with Alex.

=== Mrs. Lale "Tulip" Jones ===
When Alex first meets Alan Blunt, Mrs. Jones is introduced as his deputy when she briefed him for his first mission. Mrs. Jones is very sympathetic to Alex, and offers reassurance when Alex is uneasy about what is required to do for his missions. She shows great concern for Alex's situation – often protesting that he is not to be used again, but all the while admitting that he is useful to MI6. She shows signs of great attachment to Alex, of an almost motherly kind. Mrs Jones also had two children which were taken from her, which could contribute to why she has so much sympathy for Alex. In Scorpia, Alex breaks into her apartment with the intent of assassinating her, after Scorpia manipulate him into believing that she ordered the assassination of his father, but changes his mind at the last moment even without learning that she actually helped his father fake his death. She eventually takes over Blunt's job at the end of Scorpia Rising, swearing that Alex will never return to MI6 again.

In Never Say Die, Mrs. Jones meets Alex in France, where he has been flown by her Egyptian counterpart Colonel Manzour, on the hunch that Jack is (correctly) still alive. She believes that Alex is becoming addicted to danger, and tells him to stop. At the end of the novel, she tells Alex that if he wishes to be involved in missions, he can join; if he refuses of his own accord, she assures him that his wishes will be respected.

In Nightshade, it is revealed that the two children Alex saw in the photograph in Mrs. Jones' apartment when he was sent to kill her in Scorpia are in fact her son and daughter, William and Sofia. She reveals that their father (and her husband, from whom she is estranged but not legally separated) was "Hans Meyer", a Russian deep cover agent disguised as a German writer; when Blunt told her of "Hans'" true allegiance, she telephoned him and told him that she knew. He fled the country, abducting William and Sofia (who were six and four, respectively) in the process. She believed that she had lost her children forever, until the assassination of MI6 agent "Pablo" in Rio de Janeiro showed that Sofia was involved in the man's death; although she escaped, she was photographed. Alex goes undercover at the criminal group "Nightshade" in Crete, and discovers that William and Sofia, along with twenty-one other children, are the organisation's assassins. By the novel's end, Alex manages to reunite Sofia with her mother, for deprogramming, and Mrs. Jones hints that she may end up recruiting Alex to MI6 properly in the future. In Nightshade Revenge, Alex is able to recover William as well, and at the end of the novel Mrs. Jones resigns from MI6 to look after her children, actively ending Alex's involvement with MI6.

=== Yassen Gregorovich ===
Alex first met the Russian contract killer who killed his uncle on Herod Sayle's ground during his mission in Stormbreaker. At the time, Alex originally vows to kill him. Later, during the events of Eagle Strike, it is revealed that Gregorovich worked with Alex's father John 15 years prior. When Gregorovich's hireling captures Alex, Gregorovich is able to arrange for Alex to do bullfighting instead of being shot directly, leading to Alex being able to escape. At the end of the novel, when Damian Cray (the man who hired Gregorovich) orders him to kill Alex, he refuses and is shot and killed. Before dying, Gregorovich tells Alex that he worked with his father and to go to Venice and find Scorpia to find his destiny.

=== Tom Harris ===
Tom Harris is Alex's best friend at Brookland High School, first introduced in Scorpia, where he and Alex are on a school trip (UK edition) or holidaying by themselves in Venice (US edition). Tom's parents were going through an unpleasant divorce, and Tom was weary of their squabbling, so he went on the school trip as an escape, despite his lack of interest in actually visiting museums and other places that their teachers took them to (UK edition). In the US edition, he was invited to a holiday in Naples, Italy by his brother Jerry, and gladly accepted, bringing Alex along. In Venice he witnesses Alex stop a burglary, and creates a diversion which allows Alex to enter Casa'Vedova. Tom then becomes Alex's closest ally and confidant, learning about his friend's secret work for MI6 and aiding him further.

Tom's loyalty to Alex is unquestionable: in Crocodile Tears, Tom helps Alex escape from Leonard Straik's guards, and covers for his friend during a roll call and his subsequent return to the group. In Scorpia Rising, Tom is hit by a bullet (revealed to be a setup to get Alex to work for MI6 again), and in Nightshade Tom acts as go-between to Jack when Alex is on the run. In Nightshade Revenge, Tom is abducted by Nightshade to coerce Alex into breaking their teenage operative Freddy Grey out of prison; Freddy then proceeds to execute Tom in front of Alex, driving Alex into a blind fury, although it is later revealed that Freddy secretly slipped Tom a piece of chest armor to absorb the bullet, implying and later revealing that Alex has successfully turned Freddy.

== Appearances ==
=== Novels ===
- Stormbreaker (September 4, 2000)
- Point Blanc (September 3, 2001) (Point Blank in the United States)
- Skeleton Key (July 8, 2002)
- Eagle Strike (April 7, 2003)
- Scorpia (April 2, 2004)
- Ark Angel (April 1, 2005)
- Snakehead (October 31, 2007)
- Crocodile Tears (November 12, 2009)
- Scorpia Rising (April 5, 2011)
- Russian Roulette (October 1, 2013)
- Never Say Die (June 1, 2017)
- Secret Weapon (April 4, 2019)
- Nightshade (April 2, 2020)
- Nightshade Revenge (September 27, 2023)

=== Graphic novels ===
- Stormbreaker: The Graphic Novel (July, 2006 - UK) (October, 2006 - USA)
- Point Blanc: The Graphic Novel (September 2007 - UK) (December, 2007 - USA)
- Skeleton Key: The Graphic Novel (September 2009 - UK) Was released in USA
- Eagle Strike: The Graphic Novel (2011- UK) Was released in USA
- Scorpia: The Graphic Novel
- Ark Angel: The Graphic Novel

=== Supplementary books ===
- Alex Rider: The Gadgets (October 17, 2005) (mentioned only)

=== Short stories ===
- Alex Rider: Secret Weapon (February 9, 2003)
- Alex Rider: Christmas at Gunpoint (January 1, 2007)
- Alex Rider: Incident in Nice (November 9, 2009)

=== Films ===
- Stormbreaker (July 21, 2006) (Alex Rider: Operation Stormbreaker in North America)

=== Video games ===
- Alex Rider: Stormbreaker (September 25, 2006)

== Film ==
In the 2006 Stormbreaker film directed by Geoffrey Sax, Alex Rider is played by Alex Pettyfer, a British actor. Pettyfer was chosen from 500 hopefuls for the role of Alex. Pettyfer was fifteen years old at the time of the film's shooting, a year older than his character.

Anthony Horowitz, who was the screenwriter for the film as well as the author of the novels, recommended Pettyfer to play Alex Rider after seeing him in Tom Brown's Schooldays. Horowitz gave Pettyfer intense guidance on becoming the character of Alex Rider, expressing him and bringing his athletic talents, intellect and charm to the screen. Pettyfer undertook martial arts training with Hong Kong martial arts choreographer Donnie Yen, as well as horseback riding. Pettyfer did most of his own stunts in the film, and underwent major physical preparation for the role.

== Television series ==
In 2019, Deadline Hollywood reported that Otto Farrant would be playing the character in the upcoming Alex Rider television series, which was produced by Eleventh Hour Films and Sony Pictures Television. During the production of the first series, Farrant was 22 years old while playing the high school-age character.

== Sources ==
- Horowitz, Anthony (2000). Stormbreaker. p. 240.
- Horowitz, Anthony (2002). Point Blanc. p. 274.
- Horowitz, Anthony (2002). Skeleton Key. p. 288.
- Horowitz, Anthony (2003). Alex Rider: Secret Weapon.
- Horowitz, Anthony (2003). Eagle Strike. p. 240.
- Horowitz, Anthony (2005). Scorpia. p. 312.
- Horowitz, Anthony (2006). Ark Angel. p. 326.
- Horowitz, Anthony (2007). Snakehead. p. 398.
- Horowitz, Anthony (2009). Crocodile Tears. p. 407.
