= Alex Rider (book series) =

Spy novel series by Anthony Horowitz

- Stormbreaker, book 1 of the series
- Stormbreaker (2000); Point Blanc (2001); Skeleton Key (2002); Eagle Strike (2003); Scorpia (2004); Ark Angel (2005); Snakehead (2007); Crocodile Tears (2009); Scorpia Rising (2011); Russian Roulette (2013); Never Say Die (2017); Secret Weapon (2019); Nightshade (2020); Nightshade Revenge (2023)
- Author: Anthony Horowitz
- Illustrator: David William Peeser
- Country: United Kingdom (UK)
- Language: English
- Genre: Young adult, spy fiction, thriller
- Publisher: Walker Books; Puffin (US, CAN); Philomel Books (US)
- Published: 2000–2023
- Media type: Print (hardback & paperback); DVD
- No. of books: 14
- Website: alexrider.com

Alex Rider is a series of spy novels by the English author Anthony Horowitz. The novels revolve around the teenaged spy Alex Rider and are primarily aimed towards young adults. The series comprises 14 novels, as well as seven graphic novels, seven short stories, and a supplementary book.

The first novel, Stormbreaker, was released in the United Kingdom in 2000 and was adapted into a film in 2006, starring Alex Pettyfer as the titular protagonist. The books Point Blanc, Eagle Strike, and Scorpia books were adapted into a TV series in 2020, 2021, and 2024, respectively, starring Otto Farrant. Walker Books published the first novels in the United Kingdom alongside Puffin in the United States. More recent entries in the series were published by Philomel Books, an imprint of Penguin Books. Hirohiko Araki provided the illustrations for the Japanese version.

== Novels ==
=== List ===
1. Stormbreaker – released 4 September 2000. Adapted as a graphic novel, released 3 July 2000.
2. Point Blanc – released 3 September 2001. Adapted as a graphic novel, released 27 December 2001.
3. Skeleton Key – released 8 July 2002. Adapted as a graphic novel, released 7 September 2002.
4. Eagle Strike – released 7 April 2003. Adapted as a graphic novel, released 6 July 2003.
5. Scorpia – released 1 April 2004. Adapted as a graphic novel, released February 2004.
6. Ark Angel – released 1 April 2005. Adapted as a graphic novel, released May 2005.
7. Snakehead – released 31 October 2007. Adapted as a graphic novel, released August 2024.
8. Crocodile Tears – released 10 November 2008.
9. Scorpia Rising – released 21 March 2009 in Australia, 22 March 2009 in the US and 31 March 2009 in the UK.
10. Russian Roulette – released 12 September 2013.
11. Never Say Die – released 1 June 2017 in the UK and 10 October 2017 in the US.
12. Secret Weapon – released 4 April 2019.
13. Nightshade – released 2 April 2020 in the UK and 7 April 2020 in the US.
14. Nightshade Revenge – released 7 September 2023 in the UK and 16 January 2024 in the US.

=== Stormbreaker ===
Stormbreaker was published in 2000, in the United Kingdom, and then in 2001 in the United States. Alex, the main character, is recruited by MI6 after discovering the truth about his uncle's life and death. He is sent to complete his uncle's latest mission: to investigate the Lebanese multimillionaire Herod Sayle and his creation: the revolutionary and newly developed computer called Stormbreaker – which Sayle is donating to every school in England. Alex discovers that the Stormbreaker computers contain a lethal variation of smallpox and that Sayle plans to kill thousands of schoolchildren around the country with it. Alex foils the plan and succeeds on his first mission.

=== Point Blanc ===
Point Blanc was published in the United Kingdom in 2001, and in North America in 2002 under the alternative title Point Blank. After the deaths of two billionaires, MI6 discovers a connection: the two men who died each had a son attending Point Blanc, a school for rebellious sons of billionaires located in the French Alps, owned by Dr. Hugo Grief. MI6 sends Alex to investigate Point Blanc, where he discovers that Grief is replacing the students with clones of himself, who are altered through plastic surgery to resemble the students, including Alex himself, so Grief can inherit the fortune and gain the power to control the whole world. However, Alex foils his plan and is given a second sick note by MI6. The book was adapted as the basis for the first series of the Alex Rider television series.

=== Skeleton Key ===
Skeleton Key was published in 2002. After foiling a Triad plot to fix the 2001 Wimbledon tennis tournament and befriending Sabina, Alex is in grave danger of assassination. Forced to leave the country, MI6 sends him on a mission to Cuba with two doubtful CIA agents, of whom he is the sole survivor. He encounters former Soviet general Alexei Sarov, who tries to adopt Alex and expresses ideas of a nuclear holocaust and world domination under communist rule. Alex then foils his plans, saving the UK for the third time.

=== Eagle Strike ===
Eagle Strike was published in 2003. Popstar Damian Cray hopes to destroy the drug-making countries of the world by hijacking the United States nuclear arsenal. Suspicious of him, Alex takes Cray on without the help of the sceptical MI6. Cray releases a state-of-the-art games console called the 'Gameslayer', with its first game, 'Feathered Serpent', being much more than it seems. Alex uncovers a plot involving the US government and the international community but is caught spying and forced into a real-life version of 'Feathered Serpent' which he manages to escape by cheating. He leaves Damian Cray's mansion after stealing a piece of equipment vital to Damian's plan but is forced to give it up because Damian kidnaps Alex's girlfriend, Sabina. The two enter Air Force One, where Damian Cray launches nuclear missiles at the drug-supplying countries. Damian Cray kills Yassen Gregorovich after refusing to kill Alex, but soon after Alex pushes Cray to his death. He then disables the missiles before they can hit their targets. Just before dying, Yassen tells Alex to look for a criminal organisation called SCORPIA, a group he claims Alex's father worked for. The book was adapted as the basis for the second series of the Alex Rider television series.

=== Scorpia ===
Scorpia was published in 2004. Following the advice of the assassin Yassen Gregorovich, Alex seeks the criminal organization SCORPIA to find the truth about his father. He is soon recruited by SCORPIA executive Julia Rothman, and he is trained as an assassin before being ordered to kill Mrs. Jones. He fails in this mission but realigns with MI6 after learning that thousands of schoolchildren in London would die if he did not help them. Alex is returned to SCORPIA as a double agent and discovers the broadcasting dishes that SCORPIA intends to use to kill their targets, including Alex, as he was injected at their training school in Malagosto, which are later lifted into the sky by a hot air balloon. Rothman's henchman, Nile, tries to stop Alex, but he is afraid of heights, causing him to slip and fall to his death after being taunted by Alex. Alex manages to stop the death of the schoolchildren while Rothman herself is killed when the dish equipment falls on top of her. At the end of the novel, Mrs. Jones and Alan Blunt tell Alex the truth about his father; he was an MI6 agent working as a double agent in SCORPIA attempting to take down the organization. They also explain his parents' death, ordered by Julia Rothman after she was notified of his father's treachery along with the true details of the event that happened on Albert Bridge. As Alex leaves Liverpool Street, a SCORPIA sniper shoots him. The book was adapted as the basis for the third series of the Alex Rider television series.

=== Ark Angel ===
Ark Angel, published in 2005, follows Alex's second mission for the CIA. After recovering from a SCORPIA assassination attempt, he is sent to investigate businessman Nikolei Drevin, who built a hotel in outer space called "Ark Angel". The hotel was ultimately left unfinished due to high expenses. After Alex's cover is blown, Drevin learns that the CIA is gathering evidence against him and plans to retaliate by attacking the Pentagon. Drevin is killed and Alex is sent into space, moving the bomb to prevent the wreckage from entering the atmosphere.

=== Snakehead ===
Snakehead was published in 2007. Taking place directly after Ark Angel, the novel sees Alex crash land in Australia. There, he is recruited by ASIS, Australia's secret service, to infiltrate a Snakehead organization by posing as an Afghan refugee. He meets his godfather, Ash, while preparing in Thailand, and they team up. The Snakehead organization and its leader, Major Winston Yu, a SCORPIA board member, reportedly stole a powerful bomb called Royal Blue, which MI6 wants to intercept. During a joint British-Australian attack on Major Yu's oil rig, Ash and Alex find Royal Blue, but are apprehended by Yu, who later reveals his plan to destroy an island hosting an international summit. Ash is revealed to be an employee of Yu and is killed in the conflict over Royal Blue. Before death, Ash confesses to being ordered by Julia Rothman to murder Alex's parents. Yu tries to escape before the bomb detonates but is ultimately the sole casualty of Royal Blue's shockwave.

=== Crocodile Tears ===
Crocodile Tears was published in 2009. It begins with Alex's girlfriend, Sabina, and her family visiting the UK from San Francisco. Alex goes to Scotland with them. They go to millionaire Desmond McCain's mansion for a New Year party, during which Alex offends McCain in a game of poker. In order to stop the work of Sabina Pleasure's father, a journalist writing a book on the darkside of McCain, someone shoots their 2007 Nissan X-Trail's wheels, causing them to crash into the lagoon. Alex is rescued by a man whose identity is later revealed as Rahim, an Indian RAW agent sent to kill McCain. Indeed, McCain provokes industrial disasters to divert the humanitarian aid his association collects, and is responsible for a nuclear accident in India. Alex is recruited by MI6 to investigate McCain but is captured by him. He is taken to Kenya where he learns that McCain will poison Kenya, killing its inhabitants and animals and collecting 'charity money' for personal benefit. Alex is nearly killed by McCain but is saved by Rahim. Alex ultimately foils McCain's plan, but as they escape, McCain kills Rahim. Alex kills McCain and then ventures back to England.

=== Scorpia Rising ===
Scorpia Rising was published in 2011. A Greek billionaire, Yannis Ariston Xenopolos, hires SCORPIA to return the Elgin Marbles to Greece. SCORPIA's plan includes the laying of a false trail to Cairo, Egypt, and blackmailing MI6 into returning the Marbles. MI6 falls for the trap and Alex is sent to Cairo, where he is dismayed to find that SCORPIA has been pulling the strings all along. He also meets Julius Grief, his clone from Point Blanc who escaped from an MI6 prison in Gibraltar. He aims to personally kill Alex to avenge Dr Grief's death. Alex is captured by SCORPIA, and manages to help his long-time friend and caregiver after his uncle's death, Jack, (who has also been captured) escape. SCORPIA had anticipated this and had laid a trap for Jack. The news of her killing devastates Alex but he manages to stop SCORPIA's plan and kills Julius. The book ends when Alex escapes and moves to San Francisco with Sabina's family, changing him forever and disallowing him to return to his spy life. SCORPIA disbands after being beaten three times by a teenager, with most of its members being arrested and executed.

=== Russian Roulette ===
Russian Roulette was published in 2013 and fills the role of a prequel to the series. It is told from the point of view of contract killer, Yassen Gregorovich. Gregorovich receives orders from SCORPIA to kill Alex Rider, which sparks memories of his teenage years in a small, isolated Russian village where his parents work at a pesticide laboratory. The laboratory is also developing an anthrax strain for biological warfare. An accident in the laboratory contaminates the village, but the teen's parents manage to get a vaccine to him before dying. Gregorovich escapes with his best friend who dies on the way to the train station.

He travels by train to Moscow, where he is betrayed by a friend of his parents. He escapes and ends up living with a small group of street thieves, learning their skills. He breaks into an apartment belonging to the wealthy Vladimir Sharkovsky who catches him and takes him to his dacha outside Moscow. Sharkovsky forces him to play Russian Roulette with a single bullet to demonstrate that the boy is a slave.

Yassen is put to work as Sharkovsky's food taster and general dogsbody to the dacha with no indication that he will ever escape. After several years he discovers that Sharkovsky was responsible for the laboratory accident and swears revenge. Sharkovsky's helicopter pilot is bribed to fake a problem with the helicopter and to bring in a fake mechanic to repair it. The mechanic is an assassin employed by SCORPIA. He shoots Sharkovsky and one of the twin bodyguards. Gregorovich knocks out the other bodyguard and the two join the pilot and escape the compound.

He is taken to Venice and meets Julia Rothman who tells him that Sharkovsky is still alive, kills the assassin, and sends him to Malagosto, SCORPIA's school for assassins. By now 19 years of age he is taught the skills of an assassin, and is given his first assignment in New York. He is unable to carry out the assignment and newly arrived John Rider is assigned to work with him. The pair travel to Peru to take out a drug lord and in the process Rider saves his life. On the way back to headquarters the pair stop in Paris to carry out another contract.

Rider attempts to get Gregorovich to flee and he comes close to doing so but discovers that Rider is a double-agent. Instead of fleeing he heads to Sharkovsky's dacha. He breaks in, plays Russian Roulette again in front of Sharkovsky—this time with only one empty chamber—before killing Sharkovsky and his bully of a son. He returns to SCORPIA, but never works with John Rider again. Back in the present he receives new orders and flies a helicopter to meet Sayle. He finds him threatening Alex Rider and kills Sayle instead of following his orders. He then chooses not to kill Alex Rider remembering how his father had saved his life. In a nother book, Yassen saves Alex Rider’s life again, which causes him to die. Yassens last words were “ find scorpia” which led Alex to the events which happened in the fifth book, ‘scorpia’

=== Never Say Die ===
Never Say Die was published in June 2017 with a US release in October 2017. After the events of Scorpia Rising, Alex is left traumatized by the death of his caregiver and close friend, Jack Starbright. After being given a glimmer of hope about her survival, through an unknown email, Alex is thrust into the horrors of his past in a battle to recover his friend from the dead. Along the way, he encounters new foes (associated with SCORPIA) who are nothing like anyone he has battled before. He foils their plans of making rich parents pay to get their children back (after kidnapping the children) so they could become millionaires. In the process, he finds Jack, who then helps him free the children. He then manages to derail a steam locomotive with an improvised bomb (Thermos with diesel in it), thus killing his foes who were chasing after him in it.

=== Secret Weapon ===
Secret Weapon was published in 2019. A collection of seven adventures that Alex Rider experienced outside of the missions assigned to him by MI6. These stories occur throughout the series. Four of these short stories were already previously released by author Anthony Horowitz, but "Alex in Afghanistan", "Tea with Smithers" and "Spy Trap" were all written exclusively for this collection.

=== Nightshade ===
Nightshade was published in 2020. Alex is battling against a new criminal organization, Nightshade (after the downfall of SCORPIA) which Mrs. Jones had been reading a document about at the end of Never Say Die. After the assassination of an MI6 agent in Rio de Janeiro, one of the assassins is caught. It is a 15-year-old boy – Frederick Grey – who was presumed dead. The dead agent's final words tell about a terrorist attack by Nightshade. Mrs. Jones recognizes her daughter, Sofia, when she sees a picture of Grey's escaped partner.

Alex is sent by Mrs. Jones to pretend to be Julius Grief at the Gibraltar prison, where Julius was before escaping at the start of Scorpia Rising, and where Frederick is being held; the mission is to learn about the organization Frederick works for. Unable to get the right information, when Alex becomes friends with Frederick, he decides to escape with Frederick and then infiltrate Nightshade's base of operations, an abandoned military base in Crete. There, he learns that Nightshade is using twenty-three brainwashed children (originally 25 but 2 were killed in a "training accident") to work as mercenaries for a group of four Americans calling themselves the "Teachers".

Alex's cover is blown by Nightshade's client, and he is used as a distraction while Frederick, Sofia, and 'Number Eleven' try to kill many at St Paul's Cathedral. Alex prevents that by disabling the Teachers' communication system with their child agents. Alex tries to help Frederick after his capture and promises Mrs. Jones to help her find Nightshade, who still has her son, William, as an agent, not knowing that Nightshade is already plotting revenge against Alex.

=== Nightshade Revenge ===
Nightshade Revenge was published in September 2023. In New York, an ex-CIA agent is murdered while investigating 'Real Time' a gaming company specialized in augmented reality. In London, Alex's best friend Tom Harris is abducted. Alex is blackmailed by Nightshade chief/agent 'Brother Mike' to help them free their agent Freddy Grey. Alex has no choice and smuggles a 3D printed plastic gun into the army facility holding Freddy. On Alex's suggestion Freddy holds him hostage and they escape to an airfield. There Alex watches Tom get shot by Freddy after which he leaves with Brother Mike. Alex tries to stop them from flying off, but fails.

Tom is revealed to be alive and they discover that Freddy only pretended to kill Tom to save his life and be able to infiltrate Nightshade again. He even left a clue for Alex and MI6 to follow him. Still hoping to rescue Mrs Jones' son William from Nightshade, Alex and Ben Daniels travel to Nice. There they meet with Wilbur White, a rich art dealer whose son had an accident while playing Eden Fall (Real Time's popular AR game). He hired an investigator, revealed to be the man who was murdered by Nightshade at the start of the novel. White's villa is destroyed by Nightshade with a gunship after which Alex and Ben travel to San Francisco following Freddy's clue and the location where White's son died.

In California, Alex and Ben discover that White's son died because the AR showed him a bridge that wasn't really there. Meeting the Pleasure family again, Edward tells Alex about Jon Lucas, a young philanthropist who used to work for Rudolph Klein, the CEO of Real Time. Lucas tells Alex and Edward that the accident involving White's son wasn't the only one and that Real Time is keeping the accidents secret, especially with their newest game update Blue Devil coming up. Lucas helps Alex gain entry to the Arena where he and other players test the newest update of Eden Fall after meeting Klein and confronting him about the accidents. Alex escapes from the arena where Nightshade agents try to kill him. When he figures out what is really going on, he is captured by Brother Mike and taken to El Dorado, a mockup Western town owned by Nightshade's new client: Jon Lucas.

Lucas tells Alex he wants the market share and power of Real Time for himself and hacked their AG. Tomorrow when the newest update goes live, a bug in the system will lead thousands of players to their deaths. The public outcry of these accidents will bankrupt Real Time, giving Lucas the opportunity to buy it over and merge it with his own company. Freddy meanwhile has been trying to get 'Number Seven', who is actually Mrs' Jones' son William, to join Alex and him to free the Numbers from the teachers. However, the Teachers discover that Tom Harris is alive and that Freddy had lied to them, forcing Alex and Freddy to have a Shootout at El Dorado the next morning. Ben Daniels got Alex' information and tries to have the CIA help Alex but instead their new boss wants to kill Nightshade in one fell stroke and destroy El Dorado. To that end he is ordering an air strike on the town. In the evening Alex gives William a picture of him and his mother, trying to trigger childhood memories.

The next morning people all over the world start playing Eden Fall unaware that the game is leading them to dangerous situations. Freddy and Alex each are given a pistol to shoot one another in a true Western duel; however, Freddy shoots Brother Mike in the head and Alex shoots Lucas's leg. At that moment William shoots the other teachers and the Numbers attack their captors. Ben Daniels arrives to warn them of the air strike that's coming. Alex holds Lucas at gunpoint and orders him to stop the bugs from killing people while the Numbers fight the remaining Nightshade employees.

When the airstrike commences Alex, Ben and the numbers escape through an old mine while Lucas stays behind, choosing to die in the bombing instead of going to jail. When they come up Alex sees that Freddy was shot during the fight. He tells them that he didn't believe that he would make it in the world after all that Nightshade made him do and is glad that Alex was his friend. He dies in Alex's arms. In the aftermath Mrs Jones arranges for the CIA boss to be detained and decides to resign so she can be there for her children who are both being treated. Alex walks out hoping to never have to work for MI6 again.

== Franchise ==
=== Supplementary books ===
- The Gadgets – showing technical data of some of the gadgets (17 October 2005)
- The Mission Files – Showing mission data from books 1-7 (6 October 2008)
- Stormbreaker: Behind the Scenes – Information from the film adaptation (2006)
- Stormbreaker: The Official Script – The script of the film adaptation (2006)

=== Short stories ===
- Secret Weapon – published 9 February 2003 in The Sunday Times (post-Skeleton Key)
- Incident in Nice – published 9 November 2009 in The Times (post-Point Blanc)
- Alex Underground – published 8 August 2008 in the News of the World Summer Reading Special (post-Ark Angel)
- A Taste of Death – published online March 2012 for World Book Day (post-Point Blanc)

Christmas at Gunpoint was later published as part of The Mission Files, material from which was included in Secret Weapon, along with new material published on 4 April 2019, and which were made available on Anthony Horowitz's website.

=== Additional material ===
- Resistance to Interrogation, an extra chapter in Stormbreaker
- Coda, an extra chapter in Snakehead
- The White Carnation, an extra chapter in Russian Roulette (June 2014)

Resistance to Interrogation and Coda are available on the author's website and have all been included in certain editions of that book except Resistance to Interrogation, which was included in certain editions of Never Say Die. The White Carnation was later included in the short story collection Alex Rider: Undercover, which was published exclusively for World Book Day 2020.

== In other media ==
=== Video game ===
A video game based on the film was released on 7 July 2006, which received negative reviews.

=== Film ===
Horowitz wrote the screenplay for the feature film Stormbreaker, directed by Geoffrey Sax. Stormbreaker was an international co-production between companies and financiers from the United Kingdom, the United States, and Germany, and released on 21 July 2006. Intended to be the first entry in a film franchise, Stormbreaker grossed between $20.7 and $23.9 million worldwide upon its theatrical release, failing to recoup its $40 million budget and making the film a box office bomb.

=== Television series ===
In May 2017, it was announced that ITV was developing a television adaptation of the Alex Rider novels. The series was produced by Eleventh Hour Films, with Tutankhamun screenwriter and novelist Guy Burt acting as showrunner. Eleventh Hour Films is run by Horowitz's wife Jill Green.

In July 2018, it was reported that Sony Pictures Television had replaced ITV as Eleventh Hour Film's distribution and financial partner for a new Alex Rider television series. Sony Pictures Television's international and worldwide distribution divisions under Wayne Garvie and Keith Le Goy were attached to the film series. Burt had adapted Point Blanc, the second book in the Alex Rider novel series, for television. Horowitz will serve as executive producer for the series.

The first series was released on Amazon Prime Video in the United Kingdom on 4 June 2020. In New Zealand, the television series is distributed by TVNZ+. On 10 November 2020, the series was officially renewed for a second series. It adapted Eagle Strike and was released on 3 December 2021. The third and final series adapted Scorpia and was released on 5 April 2024.

== See also ==
- CHERUB
- Henderson's Boys
- James Bond Jr.
- Young Bond
- Jimmy Coates
- Cody Banks
- Spy School
- Spy High
