= Stormbreaker (film) =

2006 film by Geoffrey Sax

- Theatrical release poster
- Directed by: Geoffrey Sax
- Screenplay by: Anthony Horowitz
- Based on: Stormbreaker by Anthony Horowitz
- Produced by: Marc Samuelson; Peter Samuelson; Steve Christian
- Starring: Robbie Coltrane; Damian Lewis; Ewan McGregor; Bill Nighy; Sophie Okonedo; Alex Pettyfer; Andy Serkis; Alicia Silverstone; Mickey Rourke
- Cinematography: Chris Seager
- Edited by: Andrew MacRitchie
- Music by: Alan Parker
- Production companies: Moving Picture Company; Isle of Man Film; Samuelson Productions; UK Film Council
- Distributed by: United Kingdom; Entertainment Film Distributors; United States; The Weinstein Company; Metro-Goldwyn-Mayer; Germany; Sony Pictures Home Entertainment; Overseas: Capitol Films
- Release dates: 21 July 2006 (United Kingdom); 6 October 2006 (United States)
- Running time: 93 minutes
- Countries: United Kingdom; United States; Germany
- Language: English
- Budget: $40 million
- Box office: $23.9 million

Stormbreaker (also known as Alex Rider: Operation Stormbreaker and Alex Rider: Stormbreaker) is a 2006 action spy film directed by Geoffrey Sax. The screenplay by Anthony Horowitz is based on his 2000 novel Stormbreaker, the first novel in the Alex Rider series. The film stars Alex Pettyfer as Alex Rider, and also stars Robbie Coltrane, Damian Lewis, Ewan McGregor, Bill Nighy, Sophie Okonedo, Andy Serkis, Alicia Silverstone and Mickey Rourke. Stormbreaker was an international co-production between companies and financiers from the United Kingdom, the United States, and Germany.

The film's plot follows a teenage boy who is recruited by MI6 after his uncle, a secret agent, is killed in action. He is sent on a mission in Cornwall to gather intelligence behind Stormbreaker, an advanced computer system being provided to schools across Britain, and its creator, billionaire Darrius Sayle.

Intended to be the first entry in a film franchise, Stormbreaker grossed between $20.7 and $23.9 million upon its theatrical release, failing to recoup its $40 million budget, and received mixed reviews from critics, who found it lacking in both originality and believability. Plans to produce further Alex Rider films were dropped as a result. A TV series, Alex Rider, premiered in 2020.

== Plot ==
Alex Rider is a 14-year-old orphan who lives with his uncle Ian and their American housekeeper Jack Starbright. Ian is supposedly a bank manager and is, much to Alex's regret, often away from home. One day, Alex is told that Ian has died in a car crash, but quickly discovers that his uncle was actually a spy working for MI6 and was murdered.

He is then recruited by Ian’s former employers, Alan Blunt and Mrs. Jones of the Special Operations Division of MI6, who explains to Alex that Ian has been training him as a spy. Alex initially refuses to cooperate but agrees when they threaten to block renewal of Jack's visa and have her deported. Alex is then sent to a military training camp in the Brecon Beacons, the home of the British Special Air Service. At first, his fellow trainees look down on him because of his age, but he soon gains their respect with skills learned from his unwitting training.

He sets off on his first mission, aided by gadgets from Smithers. Billionaire Darrius Sayle is donating free high-powered computer systems code named Stormbreaker to every school in England. MI6 is suspicious of his seemingly generous plans and sends Alex undercover as a competition winner to investigate. There, he meets Sayle himself and his two accomplices, Mr. Grin and Nadia Vole, and is shown the Stormbreaker computer in action. Later, while Alex is having dinner with Sayle, Vole steals his phone and tracks the SIM card to his home in Chelsea. She goes there and finds Alex's true identity; while there, she is disturbed by and consequently fights Jack. Despite being outclassed, Jack wins with the help of a blowfish, leaving Nadia to flee the scene. That night, Alex sneaks out of his bedroom window to observe a midnight delivery of mysterious containers to Sayle's lair.

The next day, Alex finds himself in trouble when his cover is blown. After attempting to escape from the facility, he is captured, and Sayle explains his true reasons behind Stormbreaker – each system contains a modified strain of the smallpox virus which, upon activation in the Stormbreaker release, will kill all of the country's schoolchildren. Sayle leaves Alex tied up and departs for the London Science Museum. Nadia drops Alex into a water tank to be killed by a giant Portuguese man o' war, but he escapes using the metal-disintegrating spot cream supplied by Smithers. Nadia is subdued when she is hit by the jellyfish, rupturing the tank in the process. Alex then hitches a ride on a Mil Mi-8 helicopter piloted by Mr. Grin, using a sodium pentothal arrow to gain Mr. Grin's obedience. Alex parachutes out of the helicopter and lands just as the Prime Minister is about to press the button which will activate the computers. Alex uses a rifle to shoot the podium, which destroys the button, and ruins Sayle's plan.

Furious, Sayle leaves to carry out his backup plan, and Alex, with the help of school friend Sabina Pleasure, pursues Sayle through the streets of London on horseback. Fifty floors up on one of Sayle's skyscrapers, Alex reaches him and unplugs his backup transmitter. Sayle chases him out onto the roof and pushes both Alex and Sabina off the roof, leaving them hanging by a dislodged cable. Unexpectedly, Yassen arrives in a helicopter and shoots Sayle, in the same manner that, he did Ian, before rescuing Alex. Yassen then tells Alex that, Sayle had become an embarrassment to his employers and that, Alex should forget about him, but Alex refuses saying that, the killing of his uncle, means that, they are still enemies.

Alex returns to school; he and Sabina are talking about what happened and he says that it will never happen again. The film ends with someone observing Alex from a distance. He notices it and realizes that it's not the end.

== Cast ==
- Alex Pettyfer as Alex Rider, the movie's protagonist
- Mickey Rourke as Darrius Sayle, an American billionaire living in the UK, and the movie's main antagonist
- Alicia Silverstone as Jack Starbright, Alex's American housekeeper
- Bill Nighy as Alan Blunt, the head of MI6
- Sophie Okonedo as Mrs. Jones, the head of MI6 Special Operations
- Damian Lewis as Yassen Gregorovich, a Russian assassin working for Sayle
- Missi Pyle as Nadia Vole, Sayle's PR officer
- Stephen Fry as Smithers, the MI6 armourer
- Sarah Bolger as Sabina Pleasure, Alex's friend
- Andy Serkis as Mr. Grin, Sayle's deformed butler
- Ashley Walters as Wolf, an SAS recruit and unofficial leader of K-Unit
- Ewan McGregor as Ian Rider, Alex's uncle and legal guardian
- Robbie Coltrane as the Prime Minister, the United Kingdom head of government, Sayle's former classmate and bully
- Jimmy Carr as John Crawford, a senior MI6 agent

== Production ==
Stormbreaker was intended by the novel's author, Anthony Horowitz, to be the first entry in a film franchise based on his Alex Rider series. Horowitz, already an established and prolific screenwriter in British television, wrote the screenplay and worked very closely throughout the film's production with director Geoffrey Sax and producers Marc and Peter Samuelson. The Weinstein Company acquired the North American rights to the film, which was filmed in Summer 2005 with six weeks on the Isle of Man and a further six weeks in London. Some of the scenes of the school were filmed in The Grey Coat Hospital and Ballakermeen High School, Douglas, Isle of Man.

In 2005, Alex Pettyfer was cast as Alex Rider. He was picked out of 500 hopefuls who auditioned for the role. Pettyfer was originally offered a role in the then-upcoming film Eragon but turned it down, noting that he preferred Stormbreaker because it would be filmed nearer home while Eragon would film in the Czech Republic.

In June 2006, the producers signed a deal with Nintendo that made the Nintendo DS a prominent feature in the film, much like the Power Glove in The Wizard. This is an upgrade from the Game Boy Color that Alex used in the novel version. A tie-in game, Alex Rider: Stormbreaker was also released on the said DS and its predecessor, the Game Boy Advance. In addition to the Nintendo marketing in the film, Alex's cell phone is a Nokia 7710 and uses a sodium pentothal pen to get to London, not a gun.

In August 2006, the film was retitled Alex Rider: Operation Stormbreaker for North American release. A new poster and trailer were released along with the announcement. It was also revealed that the American premiere would take place on the Intrepid aircraft carrier at the Hudson River, New York City.

The name of the villain also changed from Herod Sayle to Darrius Sayle, with his nationality switched from Lebanese (Egyptian in the American version of the novel) to American. This was because Mickey Rourke was already in talks to take on the role, so Horowitz adapted the character to suit him.

== Reception ==
=== Box office ===
Stormbreaker was distributed by Entertainment Film Distributors in the United Kingdom, where the film made $2,313,496 on its opening weekend, well below its expected target of blockbuster status. The film's grosses gradually declined each week for the remainder of its run, totalling of $12,872,046, making up more than half of what would become the film's final worldwide gross. In the United States, the film was distributed by The Weinstein Company in 221 theatres and grossed $215,177, with an average of $973 per screen and ranking No. 27 during its opening weekend. The film earned $677,646 in the United States and $23,260,224 internationally for a total of $23,937,870 on an estimated budget of $40 million. The Numbers reported a worldwide gross of $20.7 million. In Germany, the film was given a direct-to-video release.

In a 2007 interview for Reuters, Horowitz blamed Stormbreaker's financial failings on The Weinstein Company's handling of the film's distribution on the American market, particularly their decision to not give it a wide release. According to the writer, "Harvey Weinstein decided not to distribute it. It is one of the most bizarre and annoying things that the film didn't get given its shot in America. To this day I don't know why."

=== Critical response ===
On Rotten Tomatoes, a review aggregator, the film has a score of 35% based on 65 reviews with an average rating of 4.80/10. The critical consensus states "Alex Rider: Operation Stormbreaker is strictly children's fare, as it lacks originality, excitement, and believability." The film also has a score of 42 out of 100 on Metacritic based on 20 reviews, indicating "mixed or average reviews".

BBC critic Neil Smith gave the film three out of five stars but criticised the "unsubtle turns" from both Bill Nighy and Stephen Fry. The Hollywood Reporter branded the film as "a lame and disappointing affair". Although likening it to both the Harry Potter and James Bond series, reviewer Ray Bennett said the film "lacks any kind of suspense" due to the script. He ended saying that Stormbreaker was unlikely to have a "license to kill at the box-office". Cinema Blend editor-in-chief Josh Tyler gave the film two and a half stars out of five, and said that, "Most of the problems with Stormbreaker all boil down to believability." Boston.com's reporter Wesley Morris also gave Stormbreaker two stars out of five, and said that "Geoffrey Sax's filmmaking holds few surprises... but it's swift and competent, despite too many shots of cars on roads that bloat the running time."

=== Author's response ===
During a 2013 interview with the Financial Times, Horowitz stated that the Stormbreaker film was his greatest disappointment, stating that he "did not hate it but that it should have been the first of 10 and it wasn't."

== Cancelled sequels ==
Prior to or after Stormbreaker's theatrical release, Horowitz had written a screenplay based on Point Blanc, but stated that the chances of further films based on the Alex Rider novels were "fairly slim" due to the film's underperformance at the box office. The Weinstein Company eventually cancelled their plans for a sequel, and Horowitz later expressed that the novels "do not translate well to the big screen".

=== TV adaptation ===
A rebooted television series beginning with the second novel Point Blanc was produced by Eleventh Hour Films and Sony Pictures Television. The series was released on Amazon Prime Video and TVNZ OnDemand in June 2020.
