= Alex Rider (TV series) =

2020 British spy thriller television series

- Genre: Action; Spy thriller
- Created by: Guy Burt
- Based on: Alex Rider by Anthony Horowitz
- Written by: Guy Burt
- Directed by: Andreas Prochaska; Christopher Smith; Rebecca Gatward; Jon Jones
- Starring: Otto Farrant; Stephen Dillane; Vicky McClure; Andrew Buchan; Brenock O'Connor; Ronkẹ Adékoluẹjo; Liam Garrigan; Ace Bhatti; Thomas Levin; Haluk Bilginer; Howard Charles; Nyasha Hatendi; Ana Ularu; Marli Siu; Toby Stephens; Rakie Ayola; Charithra Chandran; Gwyneth Keyworth; Kevin McNally; Jason Wong; Sofia Helin; Shelley Conn
- Opening theme: "The World Is Mine"; by Samm Henshaw
- Composer: Raffertie
- Country of origin: United Kingdom
- Original language: English
- No. of seasons: 3
- No. of episodes: 24

Production
- Executive producers: Eve Gutierrez; Jill Green; Anthony Horowitz; Guy Burt; Paula Cuddy; Nicole Finnan; Wayne Garvie
- Producer: Mat Chaplin
- Production locations: London, England; Prahova County, Romania
- Cinematography: Ben Wheeler
- Editors: Richard Smither; Ben Whitehead
- Running time: 43–45 minutes
- Production companies: Eleventh Hour Films; Sony Pictures Television

Original release
- Network: Amazon Prime Video
- Release: 4 June 2020
- Network: IMDb TV
- Release: 3 December 2021
- Network: Amazon Freevee
- Release: 5 April 2024

Alex Rider is a British spy thriller television series based on the novel series of the same name by Anthony Horowitz. Created and adapted by Guy Burt, it stars Otto Farrant as the eponymous character, who is recruited by a subdivision of MI6 as a teenage spy to undertake espionage missions. The series is Amazon's first scripted British Amazon Original series. The show is jointly produced by Eleventh Hour Films and Sony Pictures Television, and is the second screen adaptation of the novels, following the 2006 feature film version of the first novel, Stormbreaker.

The eight-episode first season, based on the book Point Blanc, premiered on Amazon Prime Video in the United Kingdom on 4 June 2020. In November 2020, the series was renewed for a second season, adapting the book Eagle Strike. The second season premiered on 3 December 2021 on IMDb TV. In June 2022, the series was renewed for a third season, adapting the book Scorpia. The third and final season premiered on 5 April 2024 on Amazon Freevee. The series has received positive reviews, with praise for the cinematography, score, and performances, particularly for Farrant and Brenock O'Connor.

== Premise ==
London teenager Alex Rider is recruited by the Department of Special Operations, a subdivision of the Secret Intelligence Service (MI6), to infiltrate a controversial corrective academy for the wayward offspring of the ultra-rich.

== Cast and characters ==
Note: Some character names are spelled differently in the books than in the TV series.

=== Main ===
- Otto Farrant as Alex Rider, a highly skilled teenager who is recruited by the Department of Special Operations.
- Stephen Dillane as Alan Blunt, the shrewd head of the Department of Special Operations.
- Vicky McClure as Mrs Jones, deputy head of the Department of Special Operations and Alex's handler.
- Andrew Buchan as Ian Rider (season 1), an agent of the Department of Special Operations and Alex's uncle.
- Brenock O'Connor as Tom Harris, Alex's best friend.
- Ronkẹ Adékoluẹjo as Jack Starbright, a UCL graduate from America, who is Alex's primary carer and later legal guardian.
- Liam Garrigan as Martin Wilby (season 1), an agent of the Department of Special Operations and a colleague of Ian.
- Ace Bhatti as John Crawley, chief of staff of the Department of Special Operations.
- Thomas Levin as Yassen Gregorovitch, a mysterious assassin.
- Haluk Bilginer as Dr Hugo Greif (season 1), director of Point Blanc, a mysterious academy.
- Howard Charles as Wolf (season 1), the leader of a Special Air Service (SAS) squad.
- Nyasha Hatendi as Smithers, the quartermaster of the Department of Special Operations.
- Ana Ularu as Eva Stellenbosch (season 1), Dean of Students at Point Blanc.
- Marli Siu as Kyra Vashenko-Chao, a hacker from Singapore and a student at Point Blanc who keeps to herself. Her character is original to the series.
- Toby Stephens as Damian Cray (season 2), an energetic tech billionaire who is poised to launch a new version of his best-selling computer game, Feathered Serpent.
- Rakie Ayola as Jo Bryne (season 2), a tough new deputy director of the CIA.
- Charithra Chandran as Sabina Pleasance (season 2), a smart and confident teen, her father is a journalist who is currently writing a book on Damian Cray.
- Gwyneth Keyworth as Evelyn Anders (season 2), Damian Cray's chief programmer.
- Kevin McNally as Max Grendel (season 3), a senior member of the crime syndicate SCORPIA.
- Jason Wong as Nile (season 3), an assassin working for SCORPIA.
- Sofia Helin as Julia Rothman (season 3), an enigmatic, wealthy widow who is secretly a high ranking agent of SCORPIA.
- Shelley Conn as Laura Kellner (season 3), the ruthless Home Secretary in the British Government.

=== Recurring ===
- George Sear as Parker Roscoe (season 1), an American graduate of Point Blanc and the heir to a media empire.
- Andrew Buzzeo as Mr. Boswell (seasons 1–2), Alex and Tom's English teacher.
- Macy Nyman as Steph (seasons 1–2), a student at Alex's school who is attracted to Tom.
- Shalisha James-Davis as Ayisha (season 1), a popular student at Alex's school who has a mutual attraction with him.
- Talitha Wing as Sasha (season 1), a model student at Point Blanc who is attracted to Alex.
- Nathan Clarke as Arrash (season 1), a model student at Point Blanc.
- Katrin Vankova as Laura (season 1), a student at Point Blanc who befriends Alex.
- Earl Cave as James (season 1), the Australian heir to an arms industry corporation and a student at Point Blanc who befriends Alex.
- Hari Dhillon as Ed Pleasance (season 2), writer and Sabina's father.
- Daniel Francis-Swaby as Dan Williams (season 2), a law intern working with Jack.

=== Guest ===
- Steven Brand as Michael Roscoe (season 1), the CEO of Roscorp Media and Parker's father.
- Llewella Gideon as Miss Baker (season 1), a teacher at Alex's school.
- Simon Shepherd as Sir David Friend (seasons 1–2), the owner of the Friend Foundation, a multi-billion pound food production and distribution empire.
- Ky Discala as Eagle (season 1), the sniper in Wolf's squad.
- Rebecca Scroggs as Snake (season 1), a member of Wolf's squad.
- Ben Peel as Fox (season 1), a member of Wolf's squad.
- Josh Herdman as Stan (season 1), a barber.
- Lucy Akhurst as Lady Caroline Friend (season 1), Sir David's wife.
- Alana Boden as Fiona Friend (season 1), Sir David, and Lady Caroline's spoilt daughter, who antagonises Alex.
- Ralph Prosser as Rafe (season 1), a friend of Fiona, who also runs afoul for Alex.
- Simon Paisley Day as Dr. Baxter (season 1), the physician and physical education teacher at Point Blanc, who Greif kills.
- James Gracie as Langham (season 1), Parker's personal assistant.
- Ali Hadji-Heshmati as Jahid (season 1), a friend of Tom and Alex.

== Episodes ==
Series	Episodes	Originally released	Network
1	8	4 June 2020	Amazon Prime Video
2	8	3 December 2021	IMDb TV
3	8	5 April 2024	Amazon Freevee

=== Season 1 (2020) ===
No. overall	No. in season	Episode	Directed by	Written by	Original release date
1	1	"Lies"	Andreas Prochaska	Guy Burt	4 June 2020
In New York City, businessman Michael Roscoe tries to arrange a meeting with Alan Blunt, Director of MI6's Department of Special Operations, about Roscoe's son Parker, but is killed by professional assassin Yassen Gregorovitch. In London, teenager Alex Rider lives with his uncle Ian, an undercover Department agent posing as a banker, and their American housekeeper Jack Starbright. Alex is caught breaking into school to retrieve his best friend Tom's confiscated phone, which Ian locks in his car's glovebox. Investigating Roscoe's connection to Point Blanc, a mysterious school for troubled teens, Ian is double-crossed by fellow agent Martin Wilby and killed by Yassen. Suspicious of the cover story that his uncle was killed in a car accident, Alex uses the Find My Phone function on Tom's phone to track Ian's car to the scene of his murder, subduing an agent and following the car back to MI6. Impressed, Blunt reveals the truth about Ian and tries to recruit Alex, who refuses. When the Department threatens Jack with deportation and Alex with foster care, Alex reluctantly agrees to help.
2	2	"Interrogation"	Andreas Prochaska	Guy Burt	4 June 2020
Blunt and his deputy Mrs Jones debrief Alex on Ian's investigation: Roscoe and another powerful businessman whose son attended Point Blanc with Parker have been killed. Alex is visited at school by Geoffrey Daniels, who claims to be a Foreign and Commonwealth Office official trying to shut down Alan and the Department for their extreme methods. Unsure whether to cooperate, Alex is kidnapped and interrogated by "Wolf" about his uncle and Point Blanc, but refuses to talk, using Ian's training to endure loud music and water torture. He manages to escape but is met by Daniels, and deduces that his abduction was a test by the Department; "Daniels" is actually Smithers, the Department's tech expert. Jack learns the truth about Ian and confronts Jones, who is assigned to be Alex's handler despite her disapproval of Blunt's plans for Alex. Martin tells Yassen that the Department is unaware Ian was killed for looking into Point Blanc, while Alex prepares to infiltrate the school as a new student.
3	3	"Friends"	Andreas Prochaska	Guy Burt	4 June 2020
Alex assumes the cover identity of "Alex Friend", son of billionaire Sir David Friend, who has been blackmailed into assisting the Department. Smithers gives Alex a communicator disguised as an MP3 player, while Department chief of staff John Crawley's investigation into Ian's death turns toward Martin. Alex spends the weekend at the Friends' country estate, where Tom surprises him under the guise of a pizza delivery and struggles to come to terms with Alex's new double-life. Alex is also forced to contend with the Friends' cruel daughter Fiona, her boyfriend, and his friends, who ambush Alex while hunting in the woods until he turns the tables on them. Point Blanc's dean Eva Stellenbosch arrives to interview Alex, who successfully poses as a spoiled, wayward rich kid. They are nearly interrupted by Fiona, who is sedated by an undercover maid. Alex is accepted into the "radical" boarding school, which isolates students from their families, and leaves for Point Blanc in the remote French Alps. An aspiring filmmaker, Tom creates a video about Alex's new life as a spy.
4	4	"Deep Cover"	Andreas Prochaska	Guy Burt	4 June 2020
At the heavily guarded Point Blanc Academy, Alex's belongings are searched and his phone confiscated, but he is allowed to keep the MP3 player. Introduced to his five fellow students, Alex befriends James and Laura, while Kyra remains a loner, and eerily well-behaved Sasha and Arrash are estranged from the group. Maintaining his cover as a troublemaker, Alex creates a mess while washing dishes and is brought to Dr Greif, the school's director, and Eva slaps Alex for defying them. Jack is unable to learn Alex's whereabouts from Jones, but reveals a call Ian made the night he died, which leads Blunt to realise Martin betrayed Ian. Unsettled by Greif's admiration of Adolf Hitler and other genocidal dictators, Alex discovers that the students' families each control an important global industry. Laura is sent to the infirmary, and Alex rejects Sasha's strange advances. The Department closes in on Martin, who visits Jack and steals a photo of Alex and Tom, but Yassen kills Martin and takes the photo. In his room, Alex is gassed unconscious for a mysterious medical procedure.
5	5	"Secrets"	Christopher Smith	Guy Burt	4 June 2020
Alex wakes up in his room, unaware he is secretly being filmed. He, Kyra, and James have had similar "dreams" of mysterious procedures, while a changed Laura now behaves like Arrash and Sasha. Yassen investigates Alex and Tom, and the Department connects Martin's phone to Yassen's employer, an unknown but highly sophisticated organisation. Dr Greif is in league with the organisation, which sends Yassen to deliver updated security protocols; he gives Greif the photo of Alex, whom he briefly meets face-to-face. Alex, Kyra, and James make a plan to escape, sneaking into Greif's office where Kyra hacks the school's security system, and James causes a distraction but is taken away by Eva. Parker Roscoe prepares to expand his father's media empire, drawing the attention of the Department, who link Parker's associate Langham to Eva. In Eva's office, Alex and Kyra find a hidden entrance to the sealed second floor, where Point Blanc has created identical versions of the students' rooms and belongings, studying them through secret surveillance footage. Alex and Kyra witness Greif and Eva murder plastic surgeon Dr Baxter, planning to "deal with Kyra" the next day.
6	6	"Escape"	Christopher Smith	Guy Burt	4 June 2020
James returns to the group, now changed like Laura, Arrash, and Sasha; Kyra is desperate to escape, but Alex is determined to find answers about his uncle's death. Discovering a lab in the school's basement, he uncovers "Project Gemini": Point Blanc's students, including Parker, have been imprisoned and replaced with surgically modified imposters. Tom is interrogated by Parker's imposter and Langham, who send his video about Alex to Greif. Captured by Greif and Eva, Alex is drugged and questioned but maintains his cover, and realises they have no knowledge of Ian or his murder. Believing Kyra has escaped and will return home, Greif arranges for the mysterious organisation to have her parents killed, while Kyra frees Alex. He tells her the truth about his mission and departs, promising to return for her and the others. Crawley rescues Tom and arrests Parker's imposter, but Langham slips away, pursued by Yassen. Jones sends Wolf's squad to extract Alex, who eludes Greif's guards on an improvised snowboard, but is struck by a snow-plough at the bottom of the mountain.
7	7	"Incursion"	Christopher Smith	Guy Burt	4 June 2020
An unresponsive Alex is taken to a hospital, where Eva watches as he is pronounced dead; however, the Department has merely faked his death. Yassen has killed Langham, and the Department discovers the imposters are actually clones of Greif, with extensive plastic surgery from Baxter to impersonate the students. Greif's plan is for his clones to assume the students' lives, kill their parents, and take over their families' powerful companies to institute a new world order; Michael Roscoe reached out to Blunt after realizing something was wrong with his "rehabilitated" son. Smithers calls Greif using the clone Parker's voiceprint, assuring him Alex was not a threat, and Tom has been eliminated. Alex convinces Jones and Wolf to carry out a rescue operation, storming Point Blanc and freeing the real students. Tricked by the Kyra clone, Alex is attacked by Eva, who is killed when the lab explodes. Greif and his clones are captured, and Alex returns home. Interrogating Greif, Blunt learns that the sinister organisation had Ian killed. Meanwhile, a clone imposter of Alex emerges from the rubble of Point Blanc.
8	8	"Truth"	Christopher Smith	Guy Burt	4 June 2020
Seeking revenge, the clone Alex finds his cover identity's passport and hijacks a van, making his way to London. Learning that her parents are dead, Kyra escapes the Department's safe house and finds Alex at school before parting ways. Posing as Alex, the clone cruelly sabotages his relationships with his crush Ayisha and with Tom. Greif is taken away for enhanced interrogation, but is killed along with a car full of agents by Yassen to protect the mysterious organisation. Alex tells Jones about his encounter with Yassen, whom the Department thought was dead, leading them to realise that the terrorism-for-hire organisation SCORPIA has emerged from hiding. At the school dance, the clone Alex captures Tom and lures Alex with a threatening video. Fighting the masked clone in the middle of the crowded dancefloor, Alex and his doppelgänger stumble outside just as the Department arrives. Tom subdues the clone, who seizes an agent's gun but is shot from afar by Yassen, saving Alex's life. Alex returns to his normal life with Jack and Tom, but Blunt appears to have other plans for him.

=== Season 2 (2021) ===
No. overall	No. in season	Episode	Directed by	Written by	Original release date
9	1	"Surf"	Rebecca Gatward	Guy Burt	3 December 2021
In the aftermath of Point Blanc, Alex struggles with PTSD and panic attacks of being followed by Yassen. Jack has begun an internship at a law firm, and arranges a camping trip to Cornwall with Alex and Tom, who is obsessed with popular video game Feathered Serpent, created by tech billionaire Damian Cray. Chasing a man he believes to be Yassen, Alex runs into fellow vacationer Sabina Pleasance and her father Ed, a journalist working on a book about Cray. Alex recognises a repairman leaving the Pleasances' rental house as Yassen himself, but dismisses this as another panic attack. When an explosion occurs at the house, Alex rescues an unconscious Ed and tries to warn the police about Yassen, giving them Jones' phone number to notify MI6. Believing Alex is paranoid, the officers tell him that a gas leak was responsible, and Jones' number is not recognised. Returning home, Alex breaks into the Department of Special Operations headquarters only to find it empty. He spots a surveillance camera, bringing him to Blunt's attention.
10	2	"Hunt"	Rebecca Gatward	Guy Burt	3 December 2021
Blunt and Jones meet with CIA Deputy Director Jo Byrne about a cyberattack on the Pentagon traced to "Smoking Mirror", a London hacker who had warned Ed that his employer was extremely dangerous. Visiting Sabina at the hospital, where Ed is in a coma, Alex spots the hacker entering Ed's room, but he escapes. Alex is determined to contact the Department, and Sir David Friend points him to Blunt's private club. Smithers recognises the code from a hack on GCHQ, for which the hacker was hired by an activist who reveals under interrogation that Smoking Mirror is Simon Mariat. Alex and Tom stake out Blunt's club, where he and Byrne discuss the US President's upcoming visit for an anti-drug charity dinner hosted by Damian Cray. Planting Tom's camera on Blunt's car, Alex is able to follow him through the city. The Department attempts to arrest Simon, who escapes and self-destructs his computers, while Alex is captured instead. Taken to the Department's new headquarters, Alex tells them about Ed and Sabina, but Blunt lies that Yassen was nowhere near Cornwall, leaving Alex to take matters into his own hands.
11	3	"Mirror"	Rebecca Gatward	Guy Burt	3 December 2021
In Amsterdam, Damian Cray prepares for the release of Feathered Serpent 2. The Department struggles to locate Simon, who lays low at an underground hackerspace. Jone and Smithers are unsure whether to help Alex, while Jack and fellow intern Dan are assigned to a deal with Damian's charity foundation. Arriving in London, Damian declares that all proceeds from his new game will be used to fight the war on drugs, having lost his brother to addiction. Alex visits Sabina, whose home has been searched, and they discover Ed's files on Damian were deleted. Accessing Ed's computer and camera, Simon identifies Alex. Tom's camera footage reveals Simon's motorbike number plate, which Alex tells Smithers, who gives him Simon's name. Damian's chief programmer Evelyn Anders informs him that Ed is still alive. Simon hacks Alex's home as a warning and arranges to meet, unaware he is being tracked by Yassen, who murders everyone at the hackerspace. Simon warns Alex that Damian is dangerous, but Yassen kills Simon and chases down Alex. Realising his quarry is Alex, Yassen lets him go and disappears as the Department arrives and finds Simon's body.
12	4	"Serpent"	Rebecca Gatward	Guy Burt	3 December 2021
Investigating the hackerspace, Jones and Crawley discover a hidden camera recorded Yassen. Alex's absences from school force Jack to cover for him, and Sabina refuses to believe him about the attempt on her father's life. Alex warns Smithers about Damian and realises that his head of public relations, Charlie Roper, was Ed's friend. Tom sets off the fire alarms in Damian's offices, allowing Alex to find Charlie, who told Ed that Damian had hired Simon. Alex believes Feathered Serpent 2 holds the answers; an advance copy is the prize for a pre-launch competition, where Charlie helps Alex pose as top player 'K7’. With a crash-course from Tom, Alex infiltrates the event and is invited to try an augmented reality version of the game. Damian increases the haptic features to batter and electrocute Alex, who manages to escape with the advance copy through the help of the real K7: Kyra. Jones is aware Smithers is receiving intel from Alex, while Damian is revealed to be in league with SCORPIA and Yassen, who is surprised to learn Alex is once again involved.
13	5	"Threats"	Jon Jones	Guy Burt	3 December 2021
The Department warns Byrne that the Pentagon hack may have been preparation for an assassination attempt during the President's UK visit. Charlie tells Sabina that he believes what Alex told her is true, and Jack learns she and Dan are up for a single open position. Kyra hacks the power grid to blackout Alex and Tom's neighborhood, allowing them to commandeer their school's computers to access the game's code. The Department brings Alex in, and Blunt reveals the existence of SCORPIA and their threat against the President, but refuses to believe Damian is involved and warns that Alex is putting others at risk. Despite Byrne and the Department's concerns, Damian — haunted by the childhood memory of finding his older brother dead of a drug overdose — refuses to delay his anti-drug dinner with the President, and Evelyn informs him that Charlie helped Alex infiltrate the event. Discovering hidden code inside the game that can only be accessed at CrayStar headquarters in Amsterdam, Alex, Kyra, and Tom remove numerous surveillance devices planted on Alex by the Department. Smithers and Jones discover that the trio have set off for Amsterdam.
14	6	"Heist"	Jon Jones	Guy Burt	3 December 2021
As the launch of Feathered Serpent 2 approaches, the Department focuses on security for the President at Damian's family manor. Jones chooses not to tell Blunt that Alex is in Amsterdam, where he, Kyra, and Tom plan to infiltrate CrayStar headquarters. Byrne tells Jones that the Department was previously infiltrated by SCORPIA, while Damian offers to show Charlie the truth in Amsterdam. Tom distracts a CrayStar delivery driver, allowing Alex and Kyra to hide in his truck and sneak inside the building. Kyra uses a stolen credit card reader to create a keycard to navigate the facility, and Alex discovers a large shipment of hazmat gear. They learn Damian is tracking Air Force One's flightplan, and hack Evelyn's terminal, downloading a secret program hidden inside the game. Framed by Yassen as the would-be assassin, Damian's head of security is arrested by Crawley. Alex and Kyra hide when Damian and Evelyn arrive with Charlie, watching as Damian admits that he hired Yassen to kill Ed. Charlie refuses to be part of Damian's plan, and Alex reveals himself to stop Damian shooting Charlie, but Damian kills him anyway.
15	7	"Assassin"	Jon Jones	Guy Burt	3 December 2021
Alex refuses to talk, but Damian threatens to kill Kyra and locks them in a room together to reconsider. Jones suggests the Department may have been tricked about the assassination plot, while Tom alerts Jack, whose firm has sent her to Damian's London office; to distract Damian, Jack sneaks into Evelyn's office and sends a mass email to the media that the launch for Feathered Serpent 2 has been cancelled. Damian discovers Alex's connection to Sabina and prepares to kill him, but is interrupted by Evelyn with news of the email. While Damian livestreams an announcement that the email is a hoax, Alex and Kyra flee with the decrypted game code and a vial containing a thumbprint. Finding Tom, they narrowly escape an armed combat drone piloted by Damian, who sends Yassen to kidnap Sabina. Suspicious of Jack's behavior at Damian's office, Dan informs their boss and Jack is dismissed. Returning to London, Alex, Kyra, and Tom meet with Jones, who brings Kyra and the game data to Smithers to unravel. Alex receives a call from Damian, who demands the thumbprint in exchange for Sabina's life.
16	8	"Strike"	Jon Jones	Guy Burt	3 December 2021
Alex surrenders to Damian, who reveals the thumbprint is the President's. Damian takes Sabina, but Alex sneaks aboard his convoy of mercenaries. Tom realises Alex has one of the Department's tracking devices, enabling Kyra and Smithers to follow him. Posing as a hazmat team, Damian and his mercenaries seize Air Force One, using the thumbprint to access the plane's command center, while Alex disguises himself as a mercenary and frees Sabina. Feathered Serpent 2 launches on 200 million devices, which the hidden code connects as a massive supercomputer, allowing Damian to hack the Pentagon's nuclear launch codes. Using deepfake technology, he poses as the President and orders nuclear strikes on narcotics-producing areas around the world, which will eradicate the drug trade while killing 1.14 million people. Before Damian can shoot Alex, he is killed by a wounded Yassen, who reveals he was friends with Alex's father and urges Alex to "find the widow. Find SCORPIA". Alex stops the nuclear launch, but Yassen escapes. Sabina's father recovers but she and Alex go their separate ways, while Kyra steals Smithers' phone with files on SCORPIA. As thanks from MI6, Jack is made a dual citizen and Alex's legal guardian.

=== Season 3 (2024) ===
No. overall	No. in season	Episode	Directed by	Written by	Original release date
17	1	"Widow"	Andreas Prochaska	Guy Burt	5 April 2024
Alex, Tom, and Kyra search for the mysterious 'Widow' in Malta, staying with Tom's older brother Jay, an extreme sports athlete, while Jack starts a new job in London. Alex is recognised by Max Grendel, a member of SCORPIA who informs the Widow, the criminal organisation's new leader. The Widow convenes a meeting of SCORPIA's senior council, preparing to destabilize the UK and bring the world under their control. She demonstrates a new weapon, 'Invisible Sword', causing one of SCORPIA's enemies in New York City to collapse and die with the push of a button. Max is unsettled by the Widow's plan to kill thousands, including children. Tracking the Widow's photograph from Smithers' files to her villa in Valletta, Alex rescues Kyra from the guards. They identify the Widow as wealthy Julia Rothman, who will be attending an exclusive museum event, and Kyra hacks the guest list to allow Alex inside. Spying on Julia as she pays scientist Dr Kovacic with $8 million in diamonds for a mysterious invention, Alex is caught by Scorpia operative Nile, but escapes by scaling the building, while Julia realises Alex's identity.
18	2	"Lab"	Andreas Prochaska	Guy Burt	5 April 2024
SCORPIA sends a USB drive with a video to the Prime Minister, threatening to unleash Invisible Sword unless the UK releases its foreign debts. Blunt tells Home Secretary Laura Kellner that SCORPIA has reemerged after 17 years in hiding, but Kellner believes SCORPIA is bluffing. Alex and Tom march into Julia's villa where a staff member, as secretly ordered by Julia, points them to "Consanto", which Kyra learns is Kovacic's ship, used as his pharmaceutical research lab. Jones informs Blunt that she will be retiring once SCORPIA is dealt with, and Smithers and new agent Pritchard track SCORPIA's video to a London office. Pritchard joins the raid on the office, where a mannequin has been left to taunt them, and is killed when it detonates. Kyra finds the Consanto's schematics, and Jay leaves them climbing gear before departing for his next competition. Sneaking aboard the ship and searching the lab, Alex witnesses Nile plant an untraceable bomb and kill Kovacic, taking back the diamonds. Confronting Alex, Nile extends an invitation from Julia for Alex to learn about SCORPIA and his own past. Meanwhile, Kyra and Tom watch as the Consanto explodes.
19	3	"Enemy"	Andreas Prochaska	Guy Burt	5 April 2024
Taken to Malagosto, SCORPIA's training facility inside a decommissioned Cold War listening station, Alex phones Kyra and Tom that he is alive. A hidden EPROM in SCORPIA's USB drive allows the Department to communicate with a disguised Julia, who promises to kill the British Reserve Football Team, and a skeptical Kellner overrules the Department's concerns. Breaking into Kovacic's apartment, Kyra and Tom discover his lab's security footage was wiped; they are arrested, but Jack secures their release over video call. Julia reveals that Alex's father John, an elite Army veteran, was dishonorably discharged and spent two years in prison for killing a man in a bar fight. Abandoned by the army and by Ian, John became SCORPIA's best operative; Julia also reveals John's love letters to her. She deploys Invisible Hand, and the football team mysteriously collapses and dies while being driven to safety in London. Julia shows Alex footage of his father's death, killed by a Department sniper during a prisoner exchange. When Julia promises to take down the Department, Alex agrees to join SCORPIA, and is introduced to his new tutor: Yassen.
20	4	"Recruit"	Andreas Prochaska	Guy Burt	5 April 2024
Eighteen years earlier, John saves an inexperienced Yassen's life when a SCORPIA operation in Nicaragua goes wrong. Alex tries to learn more about his father during Yassen's punishing training, and meets fellow trainees Syl, Alyona, Oleg, and Mateo, all orphans raised to become a team of killers. A concerned Jones asks Jack about Alex's mental state, acknowledging he was all but abandoned by the Department. Beaten by his fellow trainees for refusing to kill, Alex is given an inhalant drug that Julia claims will help him heal. His reluctance to hurt others infuriates Nile, but Yassen intervenes. Kyra and Tom trace Alex's last phone call, but Nile threatens them to return home. Competing in a training exercise with simulated gunfire, Alex realises that someone else is targeting the group. He convinces Syl to help him trick Nile into revealing himself, and she allows Alex to win the exercise. Unwilling to abandon Alex, Kyra and Tom pretend to have flown back to London. Earning the group's grudging respect, Alex is assigned to take part in Invisible Sword.
21	5	"Revenge"	Brian O'Malley	Guy Burt	5 April 2024
Kellner orders the Department to stall SCORPIA, but Julia refuses to negotiate, giving the British government three days until an entire city is killed. Kyra and Tom track Alex to Malagosto, where Max urges Julia to shut down Invisible Sword, accusing her of acting on a personal vendetta. Julia gives Alex a real world mission: stealing the contents of a safe from a heavily secured house. In the football team's locker room, Smithers and Crawley find a hidden device that dosed the players with an airborne poison. They discover a SCORPIA agent removing evidence, who takes a suicide pill, but Invisible Sword is revealed: Kovacic created undetectable cyanide nanoparticles, activated by a transmitter; once inhaled, a fatal heart attack can be remotely triggered. Realizing SCORPIA may have already dosed thousands of people, the Department races to find the large-scale transmitter. Alex and Yassen crack the house's security system, but there is no safe; the real target is Max, who is killed by Yassen, to Alex's horror. Kyra and Tom realise what has happened, and Alex breaks into Julia's office to find answers. Watching the footage of his father's death, he learns that Jones ordered the shot.
22	6	"Target"	Brian O'Malley	Guy Burt	5 April 2024
In London, Alex meets with Jack, vowing to free himself from the lies he has been told. He and Yassen have been sent to eliminate Jones, they observe the secured apartement building where she lives. Yassen warns that their work cannot become personal. Trying to discover which city SCORPIA has targeted, Jones suspects the true goal is revenge against the Department for John Rider's death. Tom and Kyra reunite with Jack, unsure whether Alex can be saved from SCORPIA. They elude the SCORPIA agent following them and inform the Department about Julia, Kovacic, and everything they discovered in Malta; however, a raid on Malagosto turns up empty. Found by Julia at his parents' graves, Alex swears revenge on the Department. Yassen learns Jack has spoken to Blunt, but Alex assures him there is no threat. With an elaborate disguise to avoid facial recognition, and a 3D-printed gun to fool the metal detectors, Alex infiltrates Jones's heavily guarded apartment by posing as a food delivery driver for another resident. Confronted by Alex at gunpoint, Jones apologizes for his father's death, and Alex opens fire.
23	7	"The Shot"	Brian O'Malley	Guy Burt	5 April 2024
Having deliberately missed the shot, an emotional Alex is comforted by Jones. Blunt stages the scene, convincing SCORPIA that Jones is dead and Alex has been captured. Two police officers stumble across SCORPIA's preparations and are killed by Nile. Alex is met by a sympathetic Smithers and Crawley, but has no information about Invisible Sword. Posing as a restoration team, SCORPIA takes over Bath Abbey, while Kellner demands a plan from the Department to stop SCORPIA. Alex explains everything to Jack, Tom, and Kyra, assuring them he never truly joined SCORPIA, and shares a kiss with Kyra. Julia reveals to Yassen that her plan was to kill Alex, having dosed him with the cyanide vapor. Jones convinces Blunt to treat Alex like a trusted agent, and he tells Alex the full truth: his father was a Department agent all along. John's prison sentence was staged, as was his "death"; after three years undercover with SCORPIA, John wanted to return to his wife Helen and their new baby, Alex. However, Julia discovered John had been a double-agent, and later caused the plane crash that killed John and Helen. Alex agrees to help end SCORPIA.
24	8	"Invisible Sword"	Brian O'Malley	Guy Burt	5 April 2024
Alex discovers that Julia dosed him with the nanoparticles, but however, chooses not to tell anyone. Kellner attempts to scapegoat the Department for her own missteps, but Blunt, Jones, Crawley, and Smithers escape with Alex, who makes a farewell call to Jack, Tom, and Kyra. Sensing something is wrong, they warn Jones, while Alex pretends to have escaped custody and is brought to Julia at the Abbey. He realises Invisible Sword is vengeance for Julia's unrequited love for his father, and she deploys the transmitter against the city of Bath. The Department arrives, and Alex races to stop the transmitter but is subdued by Nile. Julia is confronted by Jones, who kills her in self-defence. Alex holds Nile at gunpoint, but shoots the transmitter's power cable instead, saving the city. Niles escapes, but SCORPIA's members are identified from Julia's files, and Alex returns home. Blunt forces Kellner to resign, and Alex visits headquarters to find Blunt has stepped down; Jones, the new head of the Department, offers Alex a job when the time comes, while Yassen kills Nile before he can kill Alex, acknowledging each other from afar. When Kyra asks if he still wants to be a spy, Alex smiles.

== Production ==
=== Development ===
In May 2017, Variety reported that Eleventh Hour Films had optioned the film rights for Horowitz's Alex Rider series and would produce the series for ITV. Guy Burt was attached as writer. The series is directed by Andreas Prochaska and Christopher Smith.

In July 2018, Variety reported that Eleventh Hour Films would be teaming up with Sony Pictures Television to produce an eight-episode adaptation of Point Blanc, the second book in the Alex Rider series. Horowitz served as an executive producer on the series. Sony Pictures Television's international and worldwide distribution divisions under Wayne Garvie and Keith Le Goy were attached to the series. Sony was responsible for funding and looking for broadcasting or platform distributors.

On 10 November 2020, the series was renewed for a second season that adapted the fourth book in the Alex Rider series, Eagle Strike.

As of 12 May 2021, a third season was in development. In August 2022, the series was renewed for its third season that adapted the fifth book in the Alex Rider series, Scorpia with production reportedly having begun in October 2022. In February 2024, the series was confirmed to end with the third season.

=== Casting ===
It was announced on 23 April 2019 that Otto Farrant would star as the titular character. More cast members were announced the following day, including Brenock O'Connor, Stephen Dillane, Vicky McClure, Jon Brackenridge, Andrew Buchan, Ronkẹ Adékoluẹjo, Ace Bhatti and Nyasha Hatendi.

Toby Stephens, Rakie Ayola, and Charithra Chandran joined the cast for season 2.

Kevin McNally joined the cast for season 3 in an unspecified villainous role.

=== Filming ===
The first season was produced over six months, beginning in March 2019. Filming locations included London and, for the French Alps scenes, around Sinaia in Prahova County, Romania. Osterley Park, in Osterley, London doubled as the estate. Other locations in London include, South Bank, Bermondsey, The Shard, Crouch End, Millennium Mills and in the home county of Berkshire: Greenham Common.

As it was meant to be renewed earlier, principal photography for the second season was initially set to take place in late 2020 before being pushed to 2021 due to the COVID-19 pandemic. The series began production in February 2021 in Bristol, England, at the old buildings near Cumberland Basin, The Watershed & Queen Square (with Canary Wharf graphically imposed behind). In February the crew were spotted filming scenes at Goldney Hall. Filming moved to Cornwall in March 2021 and at Widemouth Bay where Otto Farrant was spotted on set. Production also took place in Cardiff in March where the city was reportedly doubling for London in some shots, and at Grittleton House, which doubles as Cray's residence. In April 2021, it was reported that Alex Rider was filming at Cotswold Airport during the night. Filming was done mostly on an ex British Airways Boeing 747-400 aircraft, the aircraft in question was G-CIVB and was used to shoot the final 2 episodes. In June 2021, author Anthony Horowitz tweeted that filming for Season 2 had concluded.

Filming of the third season began in Bristol during October 2022, with production expected to take place over six months in the United Kingdom and Croatia. In November 2022, production reportedly took place at Cardiff Bay Barrage. Filming was also conducted in Gloucester in December 2022, with production reportedly due to finish in March 2023. Location filming also took place in Malta.

== Release ==
=== Marketing ===
While promoting the series, lead star Otto Farrant praised the show for addressing societal shifts which allowed men to talk about their feelings, sensitivities, and vulnerabilities. He also stated that the series would appeal to a new teenage audience that was discovering the Alex Rider novel series for the first time by avoiding darker themes.

In early December 2021, Alex Rider creator and executive producer Anthony Horowitz confirmed that the second season would explore the protagonist's struggle with post traumatic stress disorder following the events of the first season, and that the second season would adapt the events of the fourth novel Eagle Strike. Toby Stephens, who played the antagonistic Damian Cray, described his character as less flamboyant than the book version, and drew inspiration from "Big Tech" entrepreneurs Jeff Bezos and Elon Musk for his character. Returning cast member Ronke Adékoluęjo confirmed that the second season would explore her continuing her role as Alex's guardian while pursuing her dream of becoming a lawyer.

=== Distribution ===
The eight-episode first season was released on Amazon Prime Video in the United Kingdom and Ireland on 4 June 2020, and was released on Amazon Prime Video in Australia, Germany, and Austria later in mid-2020. In New Zealand, the television series is distributed by TVNZ+. The show premiered on Prime in Canada, Italy, and Latin America, and on Amazon's IMDb TV in the United States. In December 2021, season 1 of Alex Rider was aired on E4 in the United Kingdom and became available on its streaming platform All 4.

The second season was released by IMDb TV in the United Kingdom and the United States on 3 December 2021, and on Amazon Prime Video in Australia, Canada, Italy, Germany, Latin America, and New Zealand.

In Asia, both the first and second seasons are available on SonyLIV (in India) and AXN (in Southeast Asia).

The third season was released on Amazon Freevee in the United Kingdom and the United States on 5 April 2024.

== Reception ==
For the first season, the review aggregator website Rotten Tomatoes reported an 86% approval rating, with an average rating of 6.4/10 based on 27 reviews. The website's consensus reads, "Alex Rider's first season takes a minute to find it's [sic] footing, but once it does, it proves a solid entry into the espionage game that the whole family can enjoy." Metacritic, which uses a weighted average, assigned a score of 67 out of 100 based on 8 critics, indicating "generally favourable reviews".

Reviewing for The Guardian, Lucy Mangan gave the series three out of five stars, describing it as an "improbable, action-packed romp for all your escapism needs." She described Alex Rider as a teenage James Bond, praising the lead star Otto Farrant for bringing more to the role than was written into what she described as a "serviceable script". She described the series as a blend of Jason Bourne and Spooks. NME's Will Richards gave the series three out of five stars, describing it as a second-chance for the Alex Rider series following the failure of the 2006 Stormbreaker movie adaptation. Richards observed that the series avoided the clichéd James Bond gadgets for the first two episodes. Richards praised Farrant's performance as Alex Rider but opined that the series needed tinkering to identify its target audience. Richards also described co-star Brenock O'Connor's performance as Alex's best friend Tom Harris as charismatic. While praising Marli Siu's character Kyra as a worthy addition to the male-centric world of the series, he expressed disappointment that Vicky McClure and Stephen Dillane's characters were under-utilised.

Ed Cumming of The Independent awarded the series three out of five stars, describing it as "stylish but not sanitised, catching more of the books' momentum and bringing them up to speed with the 21st century". He regarded Alex Rider as more faithful to the series than the 2006 Stormbreaker film. He also praised Farrant's version of Alex Rider as more plausible than Alex Pettyfer's version of the character, describing the former as "a teenage schoolboy with a footballer haircut but less of a male-model energy." Cumming also praised the series for aiming at both young adults and adults, inclusion of modern communications technologies like smartphones and social media, and more diverse cast. The Spinoff's reviewer Sam Brooks praised the TV series for capturing the spirit of the original novel series and appealing to both teenagers and adult fans who had grown up reading the novel series. Brooks also praised Farrant's performance as Alex Rider, opining that he nailed the soul of the teenage protagonist by capturing his strengths, moods, and fears.

The Telegraph's Anita Singh gave the series four out of five stars, describing it as "slick and stylish, bringing the stories up-to-date with smartphones and cybertechnology while sticking to the spirit of Boy's Own adventures". She regarded it as far superior to the 2006 film and praised the series for its unique cinematography of London. Singh also positively compared it to the Bourne franchise and praised the series for being able to entertain adults and teenagers alike. Emmy Griffiths of Hello! magazine compared the television series favourably to the 2006 film, praising the show's pacing, worldbuilding, and family-oriented audience. She described the series as both a "coming-of-age tale" for Alex Rider with a police-procedural subplot focusing on MI6's efforts to track down Alex's uncle Ian's killer. Griffiths also praised Farrant, McClure, and O'Connor's performances.
