= Skeleton Key (novel) =

2002 novel by Anthony Horowitz

- First edition cover
- Author: Anthony Horowitz
- Language: English
- Series: Alex Rider series
- Genre: Adventure, Spy novel, Mystery
- Publisher: Walker Books (UK)
- Publication date: 8 July 2002
- Publication place: United Kingdom
- Media type: Print (Hardback & Paperback)
- Pages: 324 pp (first edition, paperback)
- ISBN: 0-14-240102-1 (first edition, paperback)
- OCLC: 54953320
- LC Class: PZ7.H7875 Sk 2004
- Preceded by: Point Blanc
- Followed by: Eagle Strike

Skeleton Key is the third book in the Alex Rider series written by British author Anthony Horowitz. The book was released in the United Kingdom on July 8, 2002, and in the United States on April 28, 2003.

== Summary ==
On the fictional island of Skeleton Key, off the coast of Cuba, three men supply General Alexei Sarov with uranium. In the process they try to bribe him for a quarter of a million more dollars, otherwise they will go to the American authorities. Feeling threatened, General Sarov switches off the runway lights when the plane is about to take off and turns on another set of lights that cause them to fall into crocodile-infested waters.

Meanwhile, it is revealed that the real Alex Rider survived the fight with his clone in the previous book. (Note: a fight depicted in Point Blanc.) MI6 Chief of Staff John Crawley offers Alex tickets to Wimbledon, where he goes undercover as a ball boy to investigate a break-in. Alex is targeted by the Chinese Triad gang 'Big Circle' after he foiled an attempt at match-fixing by them. After two attempts on his life are made, both MI6 and the CIA arrange to send Alex away for his own safety. He is partnered with CIA agents Tom Turner (Note: renamed "Glen Carver" in American versions of the novel.) and Belinda Troy; all three being sent to Skeleton Key to investigate Sarov.

The CIA is concerned about the actions of Sarov and his upcoming meeting with Russian president Boris Kiriyenko (a childhood friend of Sarov's). En route to Skeleton Key, the "family" of Alex, Turner, and Troy stop in Miami. Much to Alex's frustration, Turner and Troy are unhappy about bringing Alex and attempt to withhold as much information from him as possible. Turner meets a criminal known as "the Salesman" on a yacht, the Mayfair Lady, correctly suspecting that the latter was involved in the sale of uranium to Sarov. The Salesman, however, is aware of Turner's true identity and plans to kill him. Alex sneaks aboard the boat and causes a distraction by setting fire to it. Using a drugged dart, Alex knocks out the Salesman. While both Alex and Turner escape by jumping into the sea, the Mayfair Lady tries to run them down, but explodes, killing everyone on board. Turner blames Alex for causing the explosion, but Alex insists he was not responsible.

In Skeleton Key, Alex notices a Geiger counter in a Game Boy Advance (Note: Nintendo DS in later publications.) console he was given by his "parents", deducing that Turner and Troy were sent to the island to search for a nuclear bomb. Turner and Troy reluctantly reveal their suspicions and their plan to infiltrate Sarov's residence – the Casa de Oro - by scuba diving into a cave underneath that features a ladder formerly used by smugglers that leads to the grounds. Alex goes with them but stays on the boat while Turner and Troy go underwater. When they do not return after a while, Alex dives in himself and, following an encounter with a shark, discovers a hidden mechanical spear trap that impaled Turner and Troy, which kills the shark as well. When he resurfaces, Alex is captured by Conrad, Sarov's right-hand man, who drugs him. Alex reluctantly tells the truth when interrogated by Conrad, who decides to kill him by feeding him into two grindstones in a sugar mill. Sarov stops Conrad, and Alex passes out.

Alex wakes up in the Casa de Oro and meets with Sarov, who reveals that Conrad planted an explosive on the Mayfair Lady to prevent the Salesman alerting the authorities. The next day, Sarov reveals his son Vladamir died in Afghanistan. Sarov plans to adopt Alex, whose physical appearance and personality are somewhat similar to Vladamir's. He has Alex hidden in a former slave house when President Kiriyenko arrives. Alex attempts to escape the mansion by hiding in the boot of a car, but is caught by Sarov using a heartbeat detector. The general spares Alex's life again, but punishes him through psychological torture. At dinner, Sarov drugs Kiryenko and has him and his retinue imprisoned, before using Kiryenko's private plane to transport Alex, Conrad, the nuclear warhead and his security detail to Murmansk, Russia, which contains a shipyard of decommissioned nuclear submarines.

Sarov plans to detonate the warhead in the shipyard to make appear as if a submarine exploded. With Europe rendered uninhabitable by the resulting nuclear fallout and Russia blamed for the disaster, doctored footage will be released to discredit Kiriyenko, ousting him from power while reverting Russia back to communism under Sarov. Sarov will then instigate wars until the entire world is under a communist government and plans for Alex to take over years later. When the plane makes a fuel stop in Edinburgh, Alex uses a gadget (a stun grenade disguised as a keyring) (Note: in the original novel, it is a Wayne Rooney keyring. It is a Tiger Woods keyring in other publications.) to escape, temporarily incapacitating Sarov and Conrad. Alex attempts to call the police but is stopped by George Prescott, a security guard. Sarov later recaptures Alex and Conrad kills the guard. The plane then lands in Russia, where Sarov reunites with soldiers who fought under him and are all loyal to his goal of worldwide communism.

At Murmansk, Conrad plants the bomb on a submarine using a crane. Alex is handcuffed to a handrail. For his betrayal, Sarov attempts to kill him in the explosion. After Sarov departs for Moscow, Alex sets himself free using his last gadget, explosive chewing gum. Alex fights with Conrad, who had decided to defy the general and kill Alex himself. The Russian army and navy arrive and initiate a firefight against Sarov's men. Despite outmatching Alex, Conrad (who has numerous pieces of metal inside his body following a failed bombing years earlier) is caught by a crane's electromagnet, pulling him with extreme force. This breaks his neck. Alex takes control of the crane, dropping Conrad's body into the sea and removing the nuclear bomb from the submarine. He then removes the detonation card, only to be told to put it back at gunpoint by Sarov, who now plans to override the bomb, detonating it and killing everyone at the shipyard but nonetheless setting his plan in motion. Alex instead throws the card into the ocean and rejects becoming Sarov's son. Unable to live with himself anymore, and to avoid being put on trial, Sarov kills himself in front of Alex.

It is later revealed that when Alex explained his predicament to Prescott, his office heard their conversation through the latter's radio. They notified MI6, who in turn warned the Russians. Alex is depressed after his harrowing adventure. However, Sabina Pleasure, whom he befriended at Wimbledon, later invites Alex on holiday with her family in France for some weeks, cheering him up.

== Graphic novel ==
In 2009 a graphic novel adaptation of Skeleton Key was released through Walker Books. This version altered some elements from the original novel, such as eliminating the attack on Alex while he was surfing in Cornwall, as well as having Sabina, already friends with Alex, attending Wimbledon as a spectator.

== Reception ==
Critical reception for both versions of Skeleton Key was mostly positive, with Booklist giving the novel version a positive review. The print version of Skeleton Key was named as one of ALA's Quick Picks for Reluctant Young Adult Readers for 2004. The School Library Journal has given praise for both editions of the story, calling the print version "rip-roaring" while recommending the graphic novel as a pick for "reluctant readers".
