= The Last Witness (2018 film) =

2018 film by Piotr Szkopiak

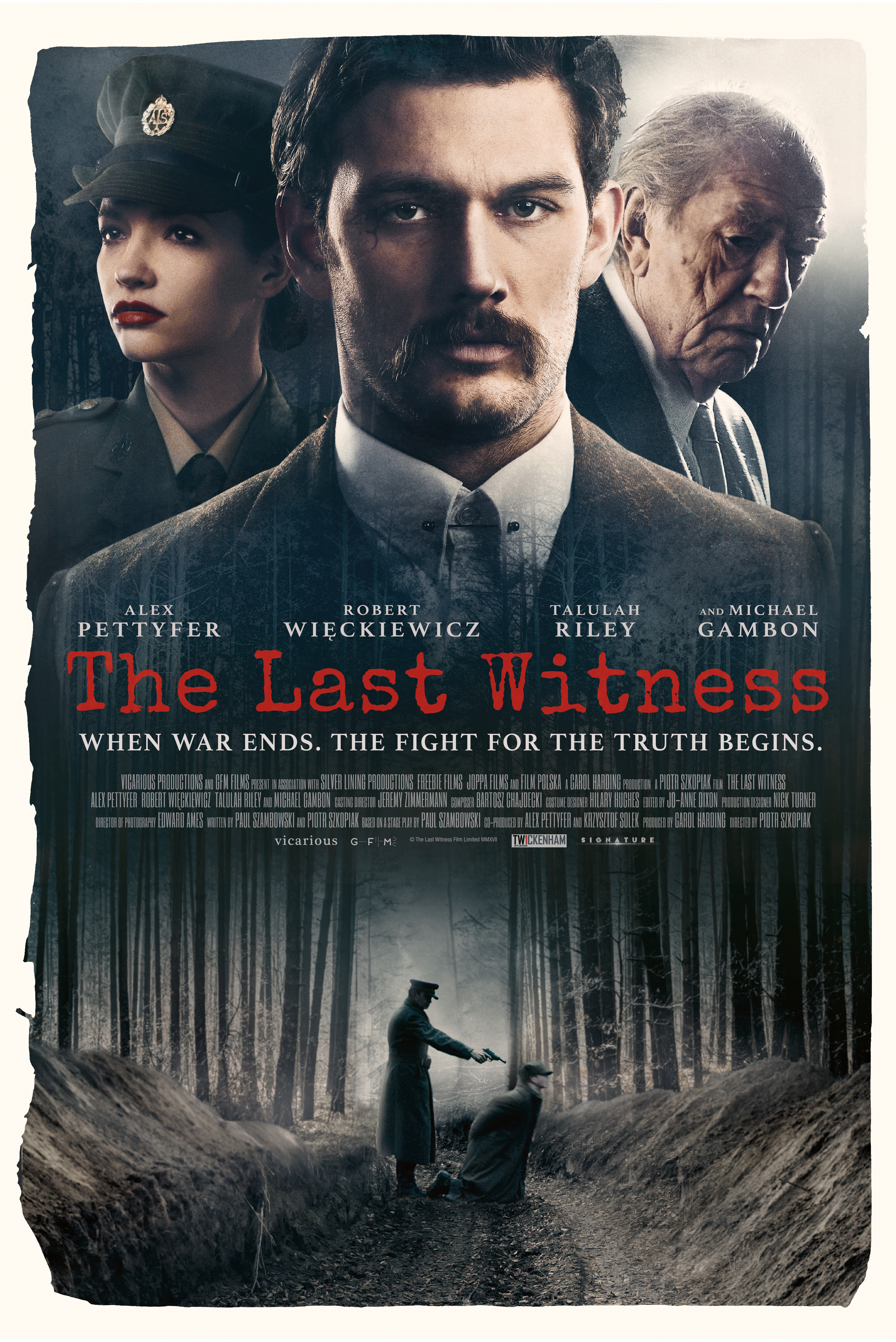
- UK theatrical release poster
- Directed by: Piotr Szkopiak
- Written by: Paul Szambowski; Piotr Szkopiak
- Produced by: Carol Harding
- Starring: Alex Pettyfer; Robert Więckiewicz; Talulah Riley; Michael Gambon; Will Thorp; Henry Lloyd-Hughes; Gwilym Lee
- Cinematography: Edward Ames
- Edited by: Jo-Anne Dixon
- Music by: Bartosz Chajdecki
- Production companies: Vicarious Productions Limited; Vicarious Productions; Dignity Film Finance; Film Polska Production; Rosevine Films
- Distributed by: Signature Entertainment (United Kingdom); Kino Świat (Poland)
- Release dates: 11 May 2018 (Poland); 29 May 2018 (United States); 17 August 2018 (United Kingdom)
- Running time: 93 minutes
- Countries: United Kingdom; Poland
- Language: English

The Last Witness is a thriller film directed by Piotr Szkopiak based on a stage play by Paul Szambowski.

The film stars Alex Pettyfer, Robert Więckiewicz, Talulah Riley, Michael Gambon, Will Thorp, Henry Lloyd-Hughes and Gwilym Lee. The film was released in Poland by Kino Świat on 156 screens on 11 May 2018, in the United States by Momentum Pictures on 29 May 2018 and through video on demand by Sony Pictures Home Entertainment beginning on 5 June 2018. It was released in the United Kingdom by Signature Entertainment on 17 August 2018. It won 44 festival awards and was screened at film festivals around the world including in Los Angeles, New York, Chicago, Toronto & Sydney.

The film deals with the impact of the political intrigue in the UK after the Second World War, surrounding the Katyn Massacre of Polish servicemen and women in Russia.

== Plot ==
A young, ambitious journalist risks love, career and ultimately his life to uncover the true identity of an Eastern European refugee and his connection to the British Government's collusion in the cover-up of the Katyn massacre, one of Stalin's most notorious crimes.

== Cast ==
- Alex Pettyfer as Stephen Underwood
- Robert Więckiewicz as Michael Loboda
- Talulah Riley as Jeanette Mitchell
- Michael Gambon as Frank Hamilton
- Will Thorp as Colonel Janusz Pietrowski
- Henry Lloyd-Hughes as Mason Mitchell
- Piotr Stramowski as Andrzej Nowak
- Gwilym Lee as John Underwood
- Charles De'Ath as the Police Sergeant
- Luke de Woolfson as Thomas Derrick
- Michael Byrne as the Coroner
- Anita Carey as Joan Caldercott
- Holly Aston as Rose Miller
- Pete Wayre as an RAF Sq. Leader & a patron in the pub

== Production ==
The script was written 15 years before the film was shot, and shot over a period of 18 days. Director Piotr Szkopiak, who was born in the United Kingdom to Polish parents, described the film as a personal experience given his grandfather was among those murdered in the Katyn massacre. It was Szkopiak's first film in 19 years.

== Release ==
The Last Witness was released in Poland by Kino Świat on 11 May 2018, in the United States by Momentum Pictures on 29 May 2018 and in the United Kingdom by Signature Entertainment on 17 August 2018.

== Reception ==
On the review aggregator website Rotten Tomatoes, 29% of 7 critics' reviews are positive. Why So Blu? gave the film a positive review, writing that "helmer Piotr Szkopiak manages to do what even some scholastic teachers have not – namely make history exciting." J. B. Spins also gave the film a positive review, praising the performances and calling the film timely, writing: "Periodically, we give lip service to the truth as a higher ideal when it helps grind our political axes, but too often, the commitment is disingenuous and short-lived. Katyn is a case in point. Putin is doing his best to walk back the Russian government’s official declaration of guilt, to the complete disinterest of our factionalized media. This is therefore a timely and much needed film in many ways, but it also functions as a gripping (and galling) historical thriller."
