= Under the Stars (2025 film) =

2026 romantic comedy film by Michelle Danner

- Release poster
- Directed by: Michelle Danner
- Written by: Victoria Vinuesa
- Produced by: Pia Patatian
- Starring: Toni Collette; Andy Garcia; Alex Pettyfer; Eva De Dominici
- Cinematography: Pierluigi Gigi Malavasi
- Edited by: Federico Conforti
- Music by: Andrea Guerra
- Production companies: Capstone Studios; Archlight Films; Nura Films; Brandos Film; Cloud9 Studios
- Distributed by: Aura Entertainment
- Release date: November 11, 2025
- Running time: 99 minutes
- Countries: United States; Italy
- Language: English

Under the Stars is a 2025 romantic comedy film written by Victoria Vinuesa, directed by Michelle Danner and stars Toni Collette, Andy Garcia, Alex Pettyfer and Eva De Dominici. The film was released in the United States on November 11, 2025, by Aura Entertainment.

== Plot ==
Under the Stars follows Ian, a struggling romance novelist who feels creatively blocked and trapped in a passionless relationship. After discovering his girlfriend has been unfaithful, heeding the advice of his aunt Audrey (Toni Collette), he leaves London and travels to the Italian countryside in search of inspiration and a fresh start.

In picturesque Puglia, Italy, Ian stays at an olive farm‑stay inn run by Giacomo (Andy Garcia) and managed by his spirited daughter Arianna (Eva De Dominici). As Ian immerses himself in the beauty of his surroundings, he begins to find his creative spark again and unexpectedly develops a deeper connection with Arianna — one that challenges everything he thought he knew about love and life.

Meanwhile, Audrey’s visit to check on her nephew leads to her own romantic entanglement with Giacomo, adding another layer of warmth and charm to the story.

== Cast ==
- Toni Collette as Audrey
- Andy Garcia as Giacomo
- Alex Pettyfer as Ian
- Eva De Dominici as Arianna
- Rob Estes as Andrew
- Jessica Serfaty as Kate
- Chiara Iezzi as Marta
- Vincent Riotta as Pietro

== Production ==
In April 2024, it was announced that principal photography had begun on "Under the Stars", with Toni Collette, Andy Garcia, Alex Pettyfer and Eva De Dominici leading the cast alongside Rob Estes, Jessica Michel Serfaty and Chiara Iezzi. The film is directed by Michelle Danner from a screenplay by Victoria Vinuesa and produced by Pia Patatian, with executive producers including Christian Mercuri, Roman Viaris, Leonardo Maria Del Vecchio, Jessica Michel Serfaty, Davide Meretti, Gary Hamilton, Ying Ye and Gian G. Foschini.

Filming took place primarily in Puglia, Italy during April and May 2024, with locations including Campi Salentina, Casalabate, Lecce and Otranto. The production made use of both historic streetscapes and local sound stages such as Brandos Studios, with support from Apulia’s regional film infrastructure. Scenes were also shot in London as part of the story’s narrative setting.

Producer Pia Patatian has described the choice of Puglia’s landscapes as integral to the film’s aesthetic, citing the region’s scenic villages, coastal vistas and cultural richness as key to bringing the story to life. The Italian production partner Brandos Film handled local production coordination and worked with the regional film commission and municipal authorities to facilitate the shoot.

== Release ==
The film was released on digital on November 11, 2025.
