= Otto Farrant =

British actor (born 1996)

- Born: 13 November 1996 (age 29); Hammersmith, London, England
- Occupation: Actor
- Years active: 2008–present

Otto Farrant (born 13 November 1996) is an English actor. He is best known for his portrayal of the titular character in Amazon Prime's spy thriller series Alex Rider (2020–2024). He previously had supporting television roles in The White Queen (2013), War & Peace (2016) and Mrs. Wilson (2018). As a theatre actor, he has performed at venues such as the Royal National Theatre and the Young Vic.

== Life and career ==
Farrant was born in Hammersmith, West London and raised in Tooting, South London. He attended Graveney School. He became interested in acting after watching a performance of Gavroche in Les Misérables. When he was young, he participated in theatre at Stagecoach Theatre School in Battersea. In 2011, he worked alongside Joanne Froggatt and Joe Cole in a production of Little Platoons at the Bush Theatre.

At eleven years of age, Farrant began performing on stage in productions at the likes of the National Theatre and Shakespeare's Globe theatre. In 2010, he made his big screen debut as Young Perseus in Clash of the Titans. In 2013, Farrant starred as Thomas Grey for 5 episodes of BBC historical drama The White Queen. In 2016, he played Petya Rostov in the BBC historical Russian based drama serial War & Peace, then played Nigel Wilson in the 2018 BBC miniseries Mrs. Wilson.

In 2019, Farrant was cast in the leading role in Amazon Prime Video's Alex Rider, a television adaptation of Anthony Horowitz's novel series, where a teenage schoolboy is recruited by MI6. Farrant stars alongside Vicky McClure and Stephen Dillane. The show premiered in the UK and Ireland on 4 June 2020, following six months of filming in 2019. The show's second season was produced during the first half of 2021 and released in December 2021. The third and final season began production in October 2022 and released in April 2024; Farrant also served as an executive producer on the third season. Following the conclusion of Alex Rider, Farrant has not been a public figure and has suggested interest in work outside of acting.

== Acting credits ==
=== Film ===
Year	Title	Role	Notes
2010	Clash of the Titans	Young Perseus	
2011	The Great Ghost Rescue	Barnabus	
2011	Salmon Fishing in the Yemen	Joshua Maxwell	
2012	Happily Ever After	Son	Short film
2014	The Departure	Soldier (voice)	Short film
2021	Edge of the World	Charles Brooke	

=== Television ===
Year	Title	Role	Notes
2010	The Bill	Archie Powell	Episode: "Who Dares Wins"
2013	The White Queen	Thomas Grey	5 episodes
2014	National Theatre Live: A Streetcar Named Desire	Young Collector	Live theatre via satellite
2014	Silk	Harry Stephens	Episode: "Heavy Metal"
2016	Marcella	Evan Jones	2 episodes
2016	War & Peace	Petya Rostov	3 episodes
2018	Mrs. Wilson	Nigel Wilson	3 episodes
2020	Strike Back: Vendetta	Nadal Topal	2 episodes
2020–2024	Alex Rider	Alex Rider	Main role; 24 episodes

=== Stage ===
Year	Title	Role	Venue	Notes	Ref.
2008	The Merry Wives of Windsor	Robin	Shakespeare's Globe Theatre: June – July 2008		
2008	Oedipus	Eteocles	Royal National Theatre – Olivier: October 2008 – January 2009		
2009	The Habit of Art	Charlie	Royal National Theatre – Lyttelton: November 2009 – January 2010	Original production	
2011	Little Platoons	Sam	Bush Theatre: January – February 2011	Original production	
2014–2016	A Streetcar Named Desire	The Young Collector	Young Vic Theatre: July – September 2014	Filmed for NT Live	
2014–2016	A Streetcar Named Desire	The Young Collector	St. Ann's Warehouse: April – June 2016	New York transfer	
2016–2017	Spool	Mind	Edinburgh Fringe Festival: August 2016	Co-writer and co-director	
2016–2017	Spool	Mind	International Dublin Gay Theatre Festival: May 2017	Co-writer and co-director	
2016	Once In A Lifetime	Rudolph Kammerling / Ernest	Young Vic Theatre: November 2016 – January 2017		
