= Ark Angel =

Sixth book in the Alex Rider series written by British author Anthony Horowitz

- First edition cover
- Author: Anthony Horowitz
- Language: English
- Series: Alex Rider series
- Genre: Adventure, Spy novel, thriller novel
- Publisher: Walker Books
- Publication date: 1 April 2005
- Publication place: United Kingdom
- Media type: Print (Hardback & Paperback)
- Pages: 326
- ISBN: 0-7445-8324-1 (first edition, paperback)
- OCLC: 58984041
- LC Class: PZ7.H7875 Ar 2005
- Preceded by: Scorpia
- Followed by: Snakehead

Ark Angel is the sixth book in the Alex Rider series written by British author Anthony Horowitz. The novel is a spy thriller which follows the attempt by the title character, Alex Rider, to stop the space hotel Ark Angel from destroying the Pentagon.

The book was released in the United Kingdom on 1 April 2005 and in the United States on 20 April 2006. Initial reviews of the book were positive.

== Plot ==
Alex Rider is recovering in a hospital after being shot. (Note: as depicted in the previous novel.) He meets Paul Drevin, the son of Russian billionaire Nikolei Drevin. One night, four men break into the hospital and attempt to kidnap Paul, but Alex overpowers them. However, he is captured by Kaspar, the leader, and imprisoned in an abandoned building where the men reveal themselves as members of Force Three. The men set fire to the building after realizing that Alex deliberately foiled their plan. Alex escapes from the fire and returns to the hospital, where he is debriefed by John Crawley, MI6 Chief of Staff, and later discharged. Back home, Nikolei Drevin convinces Alex to stay with him for two weeks as thanks for preventing his son's kidnapping.

At a hotel, Drevin holds a press conference about his space project, Ark Angel, which will be the first-ever space hotel. Alex is treated well by Drevin, but starts suspecting him after realizing that Paul had been given no protection before the Force Three attack, despite claims of always being "a target". Investigating, Alex discovers that Drevin owns the building where Alex was interrogated by Force Three. The following day, Alex participates in a race on Drevin’s private go-kart track; Alex beats Drevin when the latter attempts to cheat, revealing his hatred of losing. Later, Alex watches a soccer match at Stamford Bridge with the home team, Chelsea, up against a team owned by Drevin, Stratford East, which loses. Alex encounters Force Three members giving a medal to the team captain who missed the final penalty. Alex is captured by one of the Force Three men, but manages to get away. Alex tells Tamara Knight about Force Three, but the soccer player is killed when the medal, made of caesium, catches fire in the shower.

Drevin, Tamara, Alex and Paul fly to New York City, but Alex is apprehended at the airport by an immigration official who claims that his passport has expired. This is actually a ruse by the CIA to bring Alex to Joe Byrne, the CIA's director. The CIA have investigated Drevin's wealth and found it to be attained through underworld contacts; they plan to arrest him for money laundering. Worried that Drevin will slip away, Byrne assigns Alex to report to him if he sees anything unusual at Flamingo Bay, Drevin's private island, from where Ark Angel rockets are launched. On Flamingo Bay, Alex intercepts a phone call from Drevin, who will be meeting someone the following night. Later, however, Drevin finds out about Alex's true identity from the security chief, Magnus Payne, and decides to have him killed by sending him to dive into a shipwreck, in which he is locked in. Right when Alex is about to run out of air, Tamara saves him, revealing that she has been Joe Byrne's inside man all along. The two go undercover to investigate Drevin, and see him meeting with Force Three, but are caught when Tamara accidentally sets off an alarm.

Alex is brought to Drevin, who intends to destroy Ark Angel with a bomb and send the wreckage crashing down on the Pentagon in Washington D.C. As the project has gone over budget and Drevin stands to lose money if he continues to finance it, he plans to recoup his losses with an insurance payout from the station's destruction, while at the same time destroying the CIA's evidence of his criminal activities. Force Three are actually hired hands, formed to act as scapegoats for Ark Angel's destruction. Payne kills them all, and reveals himself to be Kaspar, the leader of Force Three, with a tattoo of a globe on his head. Alex and Tamara are imprisoned, but Alex escapes and meets the CIA team stationed in Barbados, but the Atlas rocket with the bomb launches off to Ark Angel. The CIA team storm Flamingo Island and Drevin attempts to shoot Alex in the chaos, but Paul gets hit instead. Drevin leaves Paul and tries to escape, but his plane crashes, killing him.

As there is no way to stop the bomb on the ground, Alex travels to Ark Angel in a second Soyuz-Frigat rocket to deal with it manually. He encounters Kaspar aboard Ark Angel but overpowers him using the effects of zero-gravity and the sun, and Kaspar is stabbed to death by his own knife. Alex then moves the bomb away so that the wreckage from the detonation will simply break up and disintegrate during atmospheric reentry. Ark Angel explodes and Alex falls back to Earth, landing a hundred miles off the coast of Australia.

== Characters ==
- Alex Rider
- Paul Drevin
- Nikolei Drevin
- Kaspar
- Tamara Knight
- Joe Byrne

== Reception ==
Philip Ardagh at The Guardian gave Ark Angel a positive review, stating "It's perfectly pitched at its readership. Ark Angel reads the way a children's thriller should read" and "This is a welcome new addition [to the series]."
