= Point Blanc =

Book in the Alex Rider series

- First edition (UK)
- Author: Anthony Horowitz
- Language: English
- Series: Alex Rider series
- Genre: Adventure, spy thriller, thriller
- Publisher: Walker Books (UK)
- Publication date: 4 September 2001, U.K 15 April 2002, N.A
- Publication place: United Kingdom
- Media type: Print (hardback and paperback)
- Pages: 288 pp (first edition, paperback)
- ISBN: 0-7445-5971-5 (first edition paperback)
- OCLC: 47149349
- LC Class: PZ7.H7875 Po 2001
- Preceded by: Stormbreaker
- Followed by: Skeleton Key

Point Blanc is the second book in the Alex Rider series, written by British author Anthony Horowitz. The book was released in the United Kingdom on 3 September 2001, and in North America on 15 April 2002, under the alternate title Point Blank.

In 2003 the novel was listed on the BBC's survey The Big Read. In 2007, it was adapted into a graphic novel, written by Antony Johnston and illustrated by Kanako Damerum and Yuzuru Takasaki, and in 2020 served as the basis of the first season of the Amazon Prime Video series Alex Rider, starring Otto Farrant as Rider.

== Plot summary ==
American electronics billionaire Michael J. Roscoe is killed in his New York City office by a reputable contract killer. Elsewhere, a man known as "Skoda" sells drugs to Alex Rider's classmates. After noticing this, Alex follows Skoda to his home, situated on a barge on the River Thames at Putney, but is caught by the police after using a crane to lift the barge out of the water. He accidentally drops it in a police conference centre rather than a nearby car park, as he originally intended, thanks to the builders shutting down the crane's power. The police arrest Skoda and his accomplice, Mike Beckett.

No one is killed, although some people end up heavily injured, but Alex's real identity is revealed when he is arrested. After arranging for his release, MI6 chief Alan Blunt blackmails Alex into investigating the deaths of Roscoe and General Viktor Ivanov, head of the Foreign Intelligence Service, who died in an unusual motorboat explosion, in exchange for all potential charges being dropped. The only thing linking these deaths are that both men had rebellious sons attending the Point Blanc Academy in the French Alps.

Alex undergoes a dramatic physical change and takes the identity of Alex Friend, supposedly the rebellious son of supermarket billionaire Sir David Friend. He stays with the family (Sir David, his wife Lady Caroline, and their snooty daughter Fiona) for a week in preparation for his infiltration of the academy. Fiona does not like having Alex staying with them and arranges for her 'boyfriend' Rufus and his friends to kill Alex during a shooting party in the forest; Alex gets his own back on Rufus, by frightening him and throwing his illegal gun into a pond.

He is picked up by assistant director Mrs Eva Stellenbosch, who takes him to the Du Monde hotel in Paris. (In the process, he is forced to use one of his gadgets to knock out Fiona before she can tell Stellenbosch the truth about Alex.) In the evening, the Coke he drinks at dinner is drugged; after passing out in his room, he is transported to the hotel's basement, where plastic surgeon Dr Walter Baxter has Alex stripped naked, every inch of his body being meticulously photographed, measured and examined. Afterwards, his clothes are put back on him and he is returned to his room, having no idea as to what exactly happened.

Alex arrives at the academy the next day and meets the director, Dr Hugo Grief. He later strikes up a friendship with James Sprintz, the pupil who is asked to show Alex around. In the academy, the other five rebellious students each underwent a sudden overnight change and become "perfect" pupils. James wants to escape by skiing down the Alps. Alex investigates over the following days, and one night, after sneaking out, sees James being dragged from his room by two guards led by Mrs Stellenbosch. The next morning, James has seemingly become obedient like the others, and has abandoned his escape plan. Alex investigates further, discovering that the academy's top two floors are copies of the ground and first floors, before contacting MI6 using another gadget, a Discman distress beacon.

Blunt and Mrs Jones decide to put a unit on standby, to take action the following day, whilst Alex searches the academy's basement (which can only be accessed via a hidden lift whose ground floor entrance is hidden by a suit of armour in the library). He discovers the basement is a jail, where he finds James, Michael J. Roscoe's son Paul, and all the other students, who explain that Grief has made clones of them. Alex tries to summon help, but Stellenbosch knocks him unconscious before he can.

As he regains consciousness, Grief, a former Minister of Science and BOSS officer, reveals his plan to take over the world, codenamed "the Gemini Project". In the 1990s, disgusted with the rise of Nelson Mandela and black rule in his native South Africa, he made sixteen clones of himself, and used the late Baxter (whom Alex saw Grief kill after he attempts to bribe Grief into paying him more money) to alter their appearances and resemble the sons of rich and influential people, whose inheritance will be his clones'. This will allow Grief to take over the world, as the conned families are leaders in every corner of human activity, including diamond mining, food, the military, financing, politics, and the media. Michael J. Roscoe and Viktor Ivanov were both killed for suspecting that their "sons" were acting strangely.

Grief then threatens to kill Alex the next morning through a live dissection. He is imprisoned in the basement. Alex, using his last gadget (exploding earring), escapes and snowboards down the Alps using an improvised ironing board. Pursued by two guards on snowmobiles, Alex is hospitalized in Grenoble when the force of a nearby train throws him into a fence.

Mrs Stellenbosch, who tries to kill Alex at Grenoble after being tipped off by a guard, is later told that he is dead. Meanwhile, an honour guard from the French Army carries a Union flag-laden coffin onto a C-130 Hercules, which apparently flies to London for Alex's military funeral. But this is merely a decoy, and Alex is revealed to have survived, the SAS having rescued him. Mrs Jones convinces him to return to the academy with an SAS squad, led by his former training partner "Wolf", to rescue the students.

While storming the school, Alex is attacked by Stellenbosch, who is shot dead by Wolf just before she can kill Alex. However, Wolf is also shot and injured in the process, and Alex rushes out of the building, furious, to see Dr Grief about to leave via helicopter. In a bid to stop him, Alex uses a snowmobile to drive forward, leaping off just before it collides with the aircraft. Grief is killed in the ensuing explosion.

Alex returns home, where Mrs Jones tells Alex that the mission was a success and "all fifteen clones" have been apprehended. Alex then receives a call informing him to visit Mr Bray, the head teacher at his school. But after finding a clone of himself in Bray's office, he recalls Mrs Jones’ words (as well as those of Grief, Jack, and Mr Lee the school caretaker) and realises that one clone – his own – escaped from justice. Alex fights his clone in the school, with their battle eventually causing a fire after a chemical leak in the science block, and one Alex falls into the burning school from the roof, whilst the other is rescued. It is left ambiguous which Alex survives.

== Critical reception ==
Reviewer Chris High said, "For first class spills, thrills, and adventure, Anthony Horowitz can be safely said to have cornered the modern market...influenced greatly by Ian Fleming's work." Read Hot calls it a "must read for all teenagers". The School Library Journal says, "Spy gadgets, chase scenes, mysteries, and a cliff-hanger ending will keep even reluctant readers interested in the second novel in this series." Booklist also says that Point Blanc is a great read for any reluctant teenager ready for a thrilling spy adventure.

== Adaptation ==
In July 2018 it was announced that Eleventh Hour Films would be collaborating with Sony Pictures Television to produce an eight-episode adaptation of Point Blanc as part of their upcoming Alex Rider television series. In late September 2019, Andreas Prochaska was announced as the director with Otto Farrant starring as Alex Rider.

== Awards ==
- Shortlisted for the 2002 Children's Book Award.
- Winner of the 2004 Children's Book Awards.
