= Stormbreaker (novel) =

Book by Anthony Horowitz

- First edition (UK)
- Author: Anthony Horowitz
- Language: English
- Series: Alex Rider series
- Genre: Adventure, spy, thriller
- Publisher: Walker Books (UK); Puffin Books (US)
- Publication date: 4 September 2000 (UK); 21 May 2001 (US)
- Publication place: United Kingdom
- Media type: Print (hardback and paperback)
- Pages: 240 (first edition, paperback)
- ISBN: 0-7445-5943-X (first edition, paperback)
- OCLC: 44562574
- Followed by: Point Blanc

Stormbreaker is a young adult action-adventure book written by British author Anthony Horowitz and is the first novel in the Alex Rider series. The book was released in the United Kingdom on 4 September 2000, and in the United States on 21 May 2001, where it became a New York Times Bestseller. Since its release, the book has sold more than nine million copies worldwide, been listed on the BBC's The Big Read, and in 2005 received a California Young Reader Medal.

A film adaptation, starring Alex Pettyfer as Alex Rider, was released in 2006, which underperformed at the box office and earned an indifferent reception.

== Plot summary ==
The protagonist, Alex Rider, after the suspicious death of his uncle, secretly becomes a spy for MI6. He is sent undercover to Port Tallon, Cornwall. There he discovers the Stormbreaker computer factory, where millions of computers are being filled with biological weapons which will give smallpox to the user. The aim of the attack is to kill hundreds of thousands of British schoolchildren and their teachers.

== Critical reception ==
Critical reception for Stormbreaker was mixed to positive, with the book being placed on multiple ALA lists. Common Sense Media praised Stormbreaker for its action sequences, but criticised its dialogue and logic. Kirkus Reviews also commented that the book's plot was "preposterous", but stated the readers "won't care". Publishers Weekly wrote: "The ultimate mystery may be a bit of a letdown, but that won't stop readers from racing through Alex's adventure.".

=== Awards ===
- Wisconsin Golden Archer Award (2003)
- Rebecca Caudill Young Reader's Book Award (2004)
- Utah Beehive Award (2004)
- California Young Reader Medal (2005)
- Iowa Teen Award (2005)
- South Carolina Junior Book Award (2005)

== Adaptations ==
=== Graphic novel ===
In 2005, a graphic novel adaptation of Stormbreaker was released in the United Kingdom and the United States. The graphic novel was an adaptation of the screenplay written for the movie released the year after, and was intended as a tie-in for the film.

=== Film ===
In 2006, a film adaptation of Stormbreaker was released to theatres starring Alex Pettyfer as Alex Rider with Geoffrey Sax directing. Critical reception for the film was average. Stormbreaker only held a 33% approval rating on Rotten Tomatoes with the consensus being that the film was "strictly children's fare, as it lacks originality, excitement, and believability".

=== Video game ===
A video game adaptation of the film was released in 2006 for the Game Boy Advance and Nintendo DS. The game received mixed reviews, with IGN criticising it and giving it a rating of 4/10.
