= Film franchise =

Expanded film series

A film franchise has been described as a film series which not only continued the narrative through sequels and prequels, but also included expansion through ancillary intertexts which could include spinoffs, remakes and reboots. These formats did not have to exist as films either, and could be transmedial story telling, through other elements such as novels, video games and other works.

While some early film classical Hollywood era would spawn a film series, such as Tarzan of the Apes (1918), there were generally few series. Others were lower budget material was based on brands such as Superman as film serials and radio dramas. Early franchises and series such as the James Bond films and others often had recurring characters, settings, plot formulas, but predominantly acted as stand alone stories. As time went on, audiences values began to change, leading to a greater demand for more narrative and in-world consistency between films and their adjacent media, leading to their reception in either format could effect the development of future films in a franchise.

As conglomerates began to exploit their various film and television intellectual property rights, this allowed for multimedia reiteration of works that herald a new age of what that would generate long-term audience appeal through film franchises like Jaws and Star Wars. Production of franchises continued through the 1980s becoming more in the 1990s with film series like Batman (1989–1997) and other productions led to the rise of tentpole films in the late 1990s and 2000s.

By the 21st century, the conglomeration of American film and television industries favored film franchises over original content. Various financial factors in Hollywood filmmaking led to the development of film franchises over lower budget and independent films that would carry greater financial risks. These media franchises had a what Bryan Hikari Hartzheim, James Fleury and Stephen Mamber describe as a seismic impact on the film industry. Journalist Ben Fritz went as far to say in 2018 that the franchise film era was the most meaningful revolution in film industry since the studio system had ended in the 1950s. The change of dominance of film franchises effected previous forms of making films such as the star system and with a greater emphasis on films set in a shared universe and more unity in narrative in the subtext material in the film franchises. The global box office of Hollywood film franchises became dependent that it had franchises focusing attention on Chinese film markets, and would adapt some of their material to these audiences and later collaborate with production companies in the country.

== Characteristics ==
Academic David Church in Horror Franchise Cinema (2021) wrote that terms "film franchise" and "film series" had become increasingly conflated in popular discourse. Church continued that a contemporary film franchise was multi-film series that not only pushes the narrative forward or backwards through sequels and prequels, but also includes expansion through ancillary intertexts. This allowed for a range from parallel storylines in spinoffs to re-evaluations of narratives in remakes or reboots, suggesting that a franchise has less to do with the longevity of a series, but to the proliferation that extends beyond linear development. James Fleury and Stephen Mamber echoed this in The Franchise Era: Managing Media in the Digital Economy (2019), stating that while a series consists of works in a single medium, a franchise migrates a brand across multiple forms of media. Derek Johnson further explained that a media franchise denotes "multiplied cultural production" and Daniel Herbert has specified that the term refers to a particularly "industrial" logic designed "to expand and spread" an intellectual property (IP) into an array of texts.

The importance of narrative continuity has changed in franchises over film history. Outside a few media franchises like Alien, Rocky and Shaft, few early film franchises follow a story continuity that an originating text established. Others are rebooted for new storylines like Planet of the Apes, while others such as Star Trek establish alternative timelines, serving them as both reboots and sequels. As the digital era went on, multimedia franchises became transmedial franchises which applied narrative expansion in all their texts.

As film is multimedia, it follows a top–down form of management as a franchise, where in which ancillary texts (such as tie-in video games) repeat the narrative of a primary text of a film. An example is the film Alien (1979) featuring Ellen Ripley portrayed by Sigourney Weaver trapped on the space vessel Nostromo fight to survive against an alien creature. As 20th Century-Fox followed up the first film, the franchise became transmedial as at first, it was followed up with a novelization and a pair of video games (Alien (1982) and Alien (1984)). These work borrow directly from the film's plot elements and present it abstractly as games.

Despite changes in film genres between films such as the more action film elements in Aliens and the prison film format of Alien 3 (1992), Fleury and Mamber wrote that a franchise's identity depends more on adherence to the world of the film than conventions of film genre and extends to the paratexts of a franchise. As the Alien franchise moved to becoming more transmedial, it displayed how film franchises have brought new demands in the later digital age from audiences, demanding stricter continuity among texts, stronger collaboration between licensors and licensees, and regular engagement with fans. These include narratives a central drive for the franchise economy, either through consistency or through changes with reboots, remakes and spin-offs. Daniel Herbert expanded on this, suggesting that how Star Wars: The Force Awakens (2015) "may be a single film, but it held the responsibility of representing and supporting an entire media franchise" This extended to the metatext of franchises, such as the video game Aliens: Colonial Marines (2013) was poorly received by critics who noted its lack of narrative continuity and connection with the film series. This reception led to 20th Century Fox halting development on Neill Blomkamp's Alien film production which would initially ignore Alien 3 and Alien Resurrection (1997) as audiences now placed immense pressure on individual texts in a film franchise to meet the expectations which reflect their mother text.

== Development and history ==
=== Classical and New Hollywood ===
While the early 20th century introduced certain brands such as the Lone Ranger, Buck Rogers and Superman, tended to appear in serialized formats with low budgets works such as film serials and radio serials and later with television.

Studio film productions had existed as serial entertainment in Classical Hollywood-era, though only a few films such as Tarzan of the Apes (1918) and The Thin Man (1934) spawned sequels. Universal Pictures would produce what Hartzheim, Mamber and Fleury described as a prototype of a shared universe with their Universal Monsters films, which involved plots that have the individual characters cross over into each other's individual series narratives. In Media Franchising, Derek Johnson said the Universal Monster films of the 1930s and 1940s should not be viewed as franchise, as "no such discourse was in play to make sense" of the productions and doing so would be anachronistic "cultural logic". Early cinematic universes like this were rare, showing up sporadically in subsequent decades, such as in Kevin Smith's View Askewniverse.

These radio and film serials influenced the development of franchises such as James Bond, with Colin Burnett stating that the cinematic character of James Bond, specifically that of the first 20 films (before Casino Royale (2006)), the Bond films established recurring characters, settings, plot formulas, despite primarily being stand alone stories.

Film series in the 1970s exhibited little discernible long-term planning, and often feature narrative incoherence like ignoring the death of Bond's bride in Diamonds Are Forever (1971) in Live and Let Die (1973). Other films such as Planet of the Apes (1968-1973) had endings that seemed to render a follow-up to be narratively impossible, such as the titular planet exploding at the end of Beneath the Planet of the Apes (1970).

With the New Hollywood replacing the studio system, conglomerates began to exploit their various film and television intellectual property rights, allowing for multimedia reiteration of works that herald a new age of what Hartzheim, Mamber and Fleury described as "strategically open" and "high-concept entertainment" era that would generate long-term audience appeal through franchising films likes Jaws (1975) and Star Wars (1977).

While sequels were common in the 1970s and 1980s, the concept of sequels were considered novel during this period. Films like Jaws 2 (1978) and Halloween II (1981) were promoted with posters proclaiming them to be "All New" despite retreading the narratives of their original films. By the end of the 1980s, sequels became so prevalent they becomes jokes within films like Spaceballs (1987) and Back to the Future Part II (1989) which teased imaginary sequels titled Spaceballs 2: The Search for More Money and Jaws 19 respectively. The introduction of home video in the 1980s introduced older films to new generations of audiences, leading to conglomerates to develop belated sequels like The Color of Money (1986).

=== Franchise era ===
This cycle accelerated of the late 1980s and early 1990s through films like the Warner Bros. film production of Batman (1989), which exemplified a synergy based model, allowing a franchise with sequels, animated spin-offs and other ancillary merchandise through various sectors of the Warner Bros. conglomerate. Disney specifically would make more films throughout the 1990s, particularly after Jeffrey Katzenberg left the studio in 1994. This led to rise of tentpole films in the late 1990s and 2000s. While tentpole film productions have existed since at least Jaws (1975), at the time they only represented a single part of a studios larger film production strategy.

By the 21st century, the conglomeration of American film and television industries favored franchises over original content. The fall of home video sales since 2009 due to a lack of adoption to later formats, rise of streaming and internet piracy were financially costly to film studios, and fueled the drive towards franchise films over lower budget an independent films that carried greater financial risks. The media franchises had a what Bryan Hikari Hartzheim, Mamber, and Fleury describe as a seismic impact on the film industry. Journalist Ben Fritz went as far to say in 2018 that the franchise film era was the most meaningful revolution in film industry since the studio system had ended in the 1950s. The growing influence of digital technology redefined the entertainment industry as content was no longer exclusive to traditional media companies. Media trades continued to document stories ranging from celebratory to panicked depending on the box office fate of various sequels, prequels, remakes, reboots and spin-offs.

Media conglomerates experimented with narrative chronology. Video games would be adapted from film content such as the 1984 Ghostbusters video game from the film Ghostbusters (1984). This would lead to video games that served as direct sequels to films such as Konami's The Goonies II (1987) and prequels like Star Wars: Knights of the Old Republic (2003). Later digital age franchises such as The Matrix and the MCU focused on transmedia storytelling, where audiences are required to seek out the narrative across multiple forms of media. While Reboots were initially made to resurrect ossifying franchises. while soft reboots existed for decades such as a new actor taking over for James Bond, the "hard" reboot gained popularity after Batman Begins (2005), which reset the cinematic Batman film series. Hard reboots developed a negative reputation, such as the backlash against the all female cast of Ghostbusters (2016), leading to soft reboots becoming more common.

Further narrative experimentation happened with a focus on shared cinematic universes, the production of which grew exponentially with the Marvel Cinematic Universe (MCU), which had studios shift from standalone franchises to cinematic universes to provide reliable profits. Hartzheim, Mamber and Fleury described these narratives as a natural extension of writers' rooms, a television practice where a team of writers collaborate on episodes for scripts and television season arcs, an act which they described as and lessening the impact of film directors. Conglomerates would often hire directors who would have only independent film work or television their credit such as Patty Jenkins and Taika Waititi. Several films on Star Wars and the MCU franchises have had their directors replaced during production, often citing creative differences, which caused Fleury, Hartzheim and Mamber to suggest that directors have become interchangeable for these films.

The Star system involving making films around certain popular actors was also affected by franchise films. Hartzheim, Mamber and Fleury that suggested that characters rather than film stars dominated box office. This is scene with actors like Harrison Ford being paid 50 times more than his co-stars to reprise his role of Han Solo in Star Wars: The Force Awakens (2015) while films with that featured film stars such as Money Monster (2016) and The Nice Guys (2016) did not perform well in the box office, leading to the Los Angeles Times to suggest films have moved to a character-based economy.

Fritz suggested the franchise era was similar to the studio system, except companies did not own talent, they owned cinematic brands while Wesley Morris of The New York Times summarized this in 2016 on discussing superhero film franchises, writing that "the brand comes first, Marvel is the star" in 2016. This is illustrated by film stars like Dwayne Johnson, who makes star vehicle films. His projects such as the soft reboot Jumanji: Welcome to the Jungle (2017) was a hit film, while his non-franchise films Skyscraper (2018) stumbled in the North American box office.

=== Beyond Hollywood ===
The global audience for franchise films, particularly with the rising box office in China, where the Chinese box office grew from 2.7 billion US Dollars to 6.8 billion in 2015. Ben Fritz stated these international audiences preferred "big budget films full of visual effects" and proven "brands" over most American dramas, comedies and other mid-budget productions. This led to Hollywood productions to develop blockbuster franchise films particularly for Chinese and non-American audiences. An example of this is with Pacific Rim (2013), which underperformed in both the Japanese and American box office, while its sequel Pacific Rim Uprising (2018) had grossed nearly as much in China as it had in the United States and Japan combined.

China box office influence led to indirect control over the Hollywood film market. This involved having films Skyfall (2012) be reedited for Chinese release, adding scenes to Iron Man 3 (2013), and having content changed during the scripting phase of Doctor Strange (2016) with film executives experimenting what would play best in China. Chinese companies also began investing in American film production, leading to more direct changes, such as supporting roles for actors like Angelababy in Independence Day: Resurgence (2016) and Li Bingbing in The Meg (2018). After Star Wars: The Last Jedi (2017) lost to a Chinese franchise film The Ex-File 3: The Return of the Exes (2017), Hollywood studios briefly began partnering with Chinese companies such as the Dalian Wanda Group. The Chinese company nearly purchased a 49% stake in Paramount Pictures, which was halted due to disagreements within the corporate parent company Viacom.

Some work between Hollywood franchise film and China continued such as Transformers: The Last Knight (2017), which qualified as "local" productions for Chinese regulators, allowing the films to bypass import quotas and provide Chinese producers with a higher than average box office intake. In February 2018, three Chinese franchise films (Monster Hunt 2 (2018), Detective Chinatown 2 (2018), and The Monkey King 3 (2018) opened on the same and all managed commercial success demonstrating the massive market for local franchise films in China.

== Reception ==
Lang commented in 2016 that fears persist that film franchises represent a threat to original story telling.

== Bibliography ==
- Church, David (2021). "Seriality Between the Horror Franchise and the Horror Anthology Film". In McKenna, Mark; Proctor, William (eds.). Horror Franchise Cinema. Routledge. ISBN 9780367183271.
- Fleury, James; Hartzheim, Bryan Hikari; Mamber, Stephen (2019). "Introduction: The Franchise Era". In Fleury, James; Hartzheim, Bryan Hikari; Mamber, Stephen (eds.). The Franchise Era: Managing Media in the Digital Economy. Edinburgh University Press. ISBN 9781474477741.
- Fleury, James; Mamber, Stephen (2019). "The (Im)perfect Organism: Dissecting the Alien Media Franchise". In Fleury, James; Hartzheim, Bryan Hikari; Mamber, Stephen (eds.). The Franchise Era: Managing Media in the Digital Economy. Edinburgh University Press. ISBN 9781474477741.
- Fritz, Ben (2018). The Big Picture: The Fight for the Future of Movies. Houghton Mifflin Harcourt. ISBN 9780544789760.
- Herbert, Daniel (2017). Film Remakes and Franchises. Rutgers University Press. ISBN 9780813579412.
- Hutchings, Peter (2004). The Horror Film. Routledge. ISBN 9780582437944.
- Johnson, Derek (2013). Media Franchising: Creative License and Collaboration in the Culture Industries. New York University Press. ISBN 9780814743485.
- Morris, Wesley (May 19, 2016). "The Superhero Franchise: Where Traditional Movie Stardom Goes to Die". The New York Times.
- Proctor, William (2021). "Building Imaginary Horror Worlds: Transfictional storytelling and the Universal Monster franchise cycle". In McKenna, Mark; Proctor, William (eds.). Horror Franchise Cinema. Routledge. ISBN 9780367183271.
