= Alex Pettyfer =

British actor and model (born 1990)

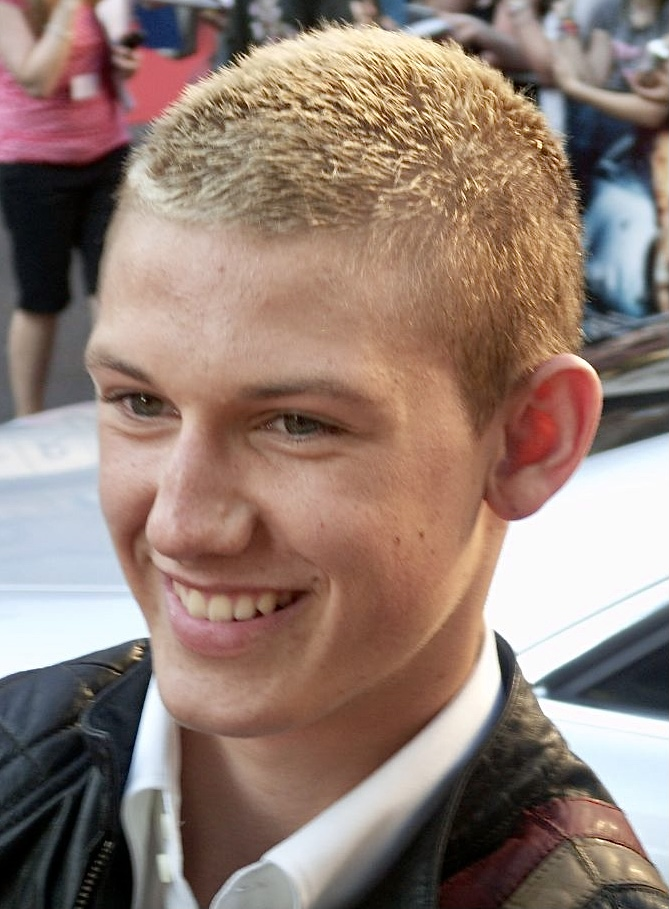
- Pettyfer in 2006
- Born: Alexander Richard Pettyfer; 10 April 1990 (age 36); Stevenage, England
- Education: Sylvia Young Theatre School
- Occupations: Actor; model
- Years active: 2005–present
- Spouse: Toni Garrn (m. 2020)
- Children: 1

Alexander Richard Pettyfer (born 10 April 1990) is a British actor and model. He started acting in school plays and on television before his breakthrough portraying Alex Rider in the spy film Stormbreaker (2006), for which he received various accolades including nominations for a Young Artist Award and an Empire Award for his role. His career progressed with starring roles in the films Wild Child (2008); I Am Number Four (2011), in which he portrayed Number Four; and Beastly (2011).

Pettyfer has since acted in a number of films, with his biggest successes being the comedy drama Magic Mike (2012), and historical dramas The Butler (2013) and Elvis & Nixon (2016), as well as in the Netflix science fiction miniseries The I-Land (2019). Outside of acting, he has modelled in several advertising campaigns for Burberry.

== Early life ==
Pettyfer was born in Stevenage, Hertfordshire, England, the son of Lee Robinson and Richard Pettyfer, both actors. His parents met while performing in London's West End in West Side Story, Cats and Miss Saigon. He has a younger half-brother, James Ireland from his mother's remarriage to Michael J. Ireland, a retired builder and property developer.

Pettyfer was brought up in Esher and then Windsor, Berkshire, and began his career initially being managed by his mother as a young fashion model at the age of seven, for Gap, after meeting Ralph Lauren in a toy store in New York. He also did advertisements for some yogurt brands. His first commercial was at age six.

As a schoolboy, he performed in plays, including in the role of Willy Wonka in a production of Charlie and the Chocolate Factory, Jack in his school play "Jack and the Beanstalk" and Robin Hood in the adaptation of The Adventures of Robin Hood (1938). Pettyfer was educated at two junior independent schools: the Mall School, a small school in Twickenham, followed by the Lambrook Haileybury school in Winkfield, Berkshire. He subsequently attended two other independent boarding schools: Millfield School in Street, Somerset and Shiplake College near Henley-on-Thames in Oxfordshire. Before his GCSEs, he left Shiplake College to attend the independent Sylvia Young Theatre School in London.

== Career ==
In 2005, Pettyfer made his professional acting début in the British television production of Tom Brown's Schooldays, playing the lead character, Tom Brown; he received positive reviews for the role. In June 2005, he was cast in his most prominent role so far, that of teenage MI6 spy Alex Rider in the film Stormbreaker, based on the novel by Anthony Horowitz. He was one of 500 who auditioned for the role. Pettyfer chose to appear in the film over a role in the film Eragon, noting that he preferred Stormbreaker because it would be filmed in Britain, in the Isle of Man, while Eragon would film in Hungary; Pettyfer has a fear of flying, and he liked the looks of the cast for Stormbreaker. In 2006, Stormbreaker was released on 21 July in the United Kingdom, 6 October in the United States, and 21 September in Australia.

One review of Pettyfer's performance described him as playing the role with an "earnest intensity", although another noted that he "isn't quite at ease as an actor". Media reports specified that the film was expected to make Pettyfer a "teen idol". In September 2006, it was reported that Pettyfer would not reprise the role if there was another Alex Rider film because he had become too mature for the role.

At around age 17, due to his earlier acting success and to supplement his income, Pettyfer started modelling, notably in some advertising campaigns for Burberry.

He next appeared in the comedy Wild Child (2008), a film set in California, Kent and Yorkshire part of which took place at Cobham Hall Girls' School in Kent. He played schoolboy Freddie Kingsley. In 2009, he played the callous ringleader of a group of cool but cruel teenagers who are picked off one by one by the ghost of one of their former victims, in the horror-comedy Tormented.

He starred in the film Beastly, based on the novel by Alex Flinn. He finished filming on 13 August 2009, and the film was released on 4 March 2011. Pettyfer portrayed the main character in I Am Number Four, released in February 2011 and directed by D.J. Caruso.

He was offered the part of Jace Wayland in the film adaptation of Cassandra Clare's best selling book, City of Bones. Jamie Campbell Bower was later cast as Jace Wayland. Pettyfer had also been offered a part in a film adaptation of Joseph Delaney's The Spook's Apprentice, but he declined the role. He was in line to star in The Paperboy, based on the Pete Dexter novel of the same name, but was dropped for the role. In 2012, he played Adam, a 19-year-old who enters the world of male stripping in Magic Mike.

In 2013, Pettyfer had a small role as Thomas Westfall in The Butler. In 2014, he starred in the romantic drama Endless Love. In 2016, Pettyfer played the role of Jerry Schilling in the biography film Elvis & Nixon. In 2017, he starred as Nick in the indie thriller The Strange Ones directed by Christopher Radcliff and Lauren Wolkstein. 2018 saw Pettyfer making his directorial debut in Back Roads where he also played the lead role of Harley Altmyer.

In 2018, Pettyfer starred as Stephen Underwood, a journalist who uncovers the horrific murder of 22,000 Poles under Stalin's instructions, in the post–World War II thriller The Last Witness. In the same year, it was announced that Pettyfer had been cast in the main role of Brody on the Netflix science fiction miniseries The I-Land. The miniseries was released on 12 September 2019.

== Personal life ==
In June 2009, Pettyfer was voted number 35 on British women's magazine Company's list of the top 50 most eligible bachelors. In August 2009, the British magazine Glamour ranked him number 21 on their list of the sexiest men on the planet.

Pettyfer completed filming Stormbreaker, but he did not discuss the film with anyone at his school, citing the advice of his costar Ewan McGregor, who told him to keep his personal and professional lives separate. Pettyfer subsequently decided to leave school without any qualifications and concentrate on his film career, saying that "When you have already experienced going out and working in the real world, and you come back to school, you just see it as a playground and you don't want to be there any more."

In a 2011 interview, he stated "I felt like the industry was just a factory. You hear a lot of people say they want to make art in this industry, but so few people actually fucking do it. I was disillusioned by Hollywood at the time, but now I've come to accept that's just the way things are: it's called show business, not show art." In the same interview, when asked about how he liked living in Los Angeles, he stated, "LA is growing on me a little bit, but it's still a shit-hole. I think it's this insidious pool where nearly everyone lives in fear. Geographically it's fantastic: in a half hour, you can be on the beach in one direction, go snowboarding in another, or go out into the desert. But socially it's disgusting. I wish they'd just run all the cunts out."

=== Relationships and marriage ===
Pettyfer was briefly engaged to actress Riley Keough in 2012. They met while filming Magic Mike.

On 24 December 2019, he became engaged to German model Toni Garrn after ten months of dating. They were married in Hamburg, Germany, on 2 October 2020. They have a daughter, born in 2021.

On 22 April 2023, Garrn announced through her Instagram account that the couple were divorcing.

==== Allegations of domestic violence ====
In July 2010, Pettyfer began dating American actress Dianna Agron, his I Am Number Four co-star. They began sharing a Los Angeles home until their breakup. He was reportedly controlling and paranoid throughout their relationship, but in 2011 rumors of their engagement were published by People. The couple broke up in February 2011, the day after the film was released, with reports that Pettyfer threatened Agron over the phone and had a "heated confrontation" with actor Sebastian Stan, someone with whom Agron was close in early 2011. She temporarily moved to a hotel under a false name so that Pettyfer would not be able to find her, and he was instructed by his agents not to attend an event where she would be present.

== Filmography ==
=== Film ===
Year	Title	Role	Notes
2006	Stormbreaker	Alex Rider	
2008	Wild Child	Freddie Kingsley	
2009	Tormented	Bradley White	
2011	I Am Number Four	John Smith	
2011	Beastly	Kyle Kingson	
2011	In Time	Fortis	
2012	Magic Mike	Adam	
2013	The Butler	Thomas Westfall	
2014	Endless Love	David Elliot	
2016	Elvis & Nixon	Jerry Schilling	
2017	The Strange Ones	Nick	
2018	Back Roads	Harley Altmyer	Also director
2018	The Last Witness	Stephen Underwood	
2020	Echo Boomers	Ellis Beck	
2021	Collection	Brandon	
2021	Warning	Liam	
2022	The Infernal Machine	Dwight Tufford	
2023	Black Noise	Jordan	
2024	Sunrise	Fallon	
2024	5lbs of Pressure	Leff	
2024	The Ministry of Ungentlemanly Warfare	Geoffrey Appleyard	
2024	Chief of Station	John Branca	
2025	Under the Stars	Ian	

=== Television ===
Year	Title	Role	Notes
2005	Tom Brown's Schooldays	Tom Brown	Television film
2018	Urban Myths	Tony Curtis	Episode: "Marilyn Monroe and Billy Wilder"
2019	The I-Land	Brody	Main role
2020	Family Guy	Troy (voice)	Episode: "The Movement"

=== Directorial ===
Year	Title	Notes
2018	Back Roads	Directorial debut

== Modelling ==
- 2008: Burberry – Spring/Summer
- 2008: Burberry – The Beat For Men eau de cologne
- 2009: Burberry – Spring/Summer

== Awards and nominations ==
Year	Award	Category	Nominated work	Result
2007	Young Artist Awards	Best Performance in an International Feature Film Leading Young Actor or Actress	Stormbreaker	Nominated
2007	Empire Award	Best Male Newcomer	Stormbreaker	Nominated
2010	ShoWest Award	Male Star of Tomorrow	N/A	Won
2011	MTV Movie Awards	Biggest Badass Star	I Am Number Four	Nominated
2011	Teen Choice Awards	Choice Movie: Liplock (shared with Vanessa Hudgens)	Beastly	Nominated
2011	Teen Choice Awards	Choice Movie: Breakout Male	Beastly and I Am Number Four	Won
2014	Acapulco Black Film Festival	Best Ensemble Cast	The Butler	Nominated
2014	Screen Actors Guild Awards	Outstanding Performance by a Cast in a Motion Picture	The Butler	Nominated
2014	Brasov International Film Festival and Market	Best Lead Actor	Endless Love	Won
