= Alex Rider: Stormbreaker =

2006 video game

- North American DS box art
- Developers: Razorback Developments (GBA); Altron (DS)
- Publisher: THQ
- Composers: Allister Brimble, Anthony N. Putson
- Platforms: Nintendo DS, Game Boy Advance
- Release: UK: 7 July 2006; NA: 25 September 2006
- Genre: Action-adventure
- Mode: Single-player

Alex Rider: Stormbreaker is the name of two video games based on the 2006 film Stormbreaker, which in turn was an adaptation of the original 2000 novel. They were released in 2006, on 7 July in UK, and 25 September in the U.S. for Nintendo DS and Game Boy Advance, with the former platform itself prominently appearing in the film as part of a marketing deal with Nintendo.

== Gameplay ==
The Game Boy Advance Stormbreaker is an overhead action and stealth game, where players take control of Alex (and once, his uncle Ian) in several missions. Alex gains several gadgets over the course of the game, which are integral to mission completion. Also included is an array of minigames by weapon inventor Smithers. There is also an MI6 training camp mode for players to test out their skills.

== Reception ==
Reception

Aggregate score
Aggregator	Score
GameRankings	51.10%

Review score
Publication	Score
GameZone	3.9/10; 3.6/10

The game was criticised by many gaming sites and magazines, with Pocket Gamer writing that it "just isn't good enough". Review aggregator Metacritic lists the game's rating at 48 out of 100 based on 11 reviews, with Nintendo Power commenting that the "basic gameplay is flawed in every way". IGN gave it a 'poor' rating of 4.0/10.
