= List of Alex Rider characters =

This is a list of characters from Anthony Horowitz's Alex Rider series. This includes characters from the novels, the film, the television series, the graphic novels, and the short stories.

== Cast overview ==
Character	Portrayed by	Appearances		
Character	Portrayed by	Season 1	Season 2	Season 3
Alex Rider	Otto Farrant	Main	Main	Main
Alan Blunt	Stephen Dillane	Main	Main	Main
Mrs. Jones	Vicky McClure	Main	Main	Main
Ian Rider	Andrew Buchan	Main (Note: Andrew Buchan is credited with the main cast despite only appearing in one episode.)		
Tom Harris	Brenock O'Connor	Main	Main	Main
Jack Starbright	Ronkẹ Adékoluẹjo	Main	Main	Main
Martin Wilby	Liam Garrigan	Main		
John Crawley	Ace Bhatti	Main	Main	Main
Yassen Gregorovitch	Thomas Levin	Main	Main	Main
Dr. Hugo Grief	Haluk Bilginer	Main		
Wolf	Howard Charles	Main		
Smithers	Nyasha Hatendi	Main	Main	Main
Eva Stellenbosch	Ana Ularu	Main		
Kyra Vashenko-Chao	Marli Siu	Main	Main	Main
Damian Cray	Toby Stephens		Main	
Jo Bryne	Rakie Ayola		Main	
Sabina Pleasance	Charithra Chandran		Main	
Evelyn	Gwyneth Keyworth		Main	
Max Grendel	Kevin McNally			Main
Nile	Jason Wong			Main
Julia Rothman	Sofia Helin			Main
Laura Kellner	Shelley Conn			Main

== Protagonists ==
The following is a list of the protagonists recurring, appearing in, or referred to in the Alex Rider series, listed alphabetically.

=== Alan Blunt ===
Alan Blunt was the head of MI6 Special Operations until Scorpia Rising. He is an aloof, impassive, and ruthless man. Throughout the series he is known for wearing a grey suit and grey glasses and being driven around in a Rolls-Royce. From the book Point Blanc, it is said that he had graduated with a First-Class Honours degree in mathematics from Cambridge University. Blunt is dedicated to his job and has a very analytical mind. After the events of the book Scorpia Rising and Scorpia's demise, Alan Blunt retires from his role at MI6, supposedly forced to by pressure from higher-ups. His assistant Lâle "Tulip" Jones, known better as Mrs. Jones, takes over from the end of Scorpia Rising onwards. It is stated in the same book that he receives knighthood following his retirement.

In the film Stormbreaker, Blunt was portrayed by Bill Nighy, and in the TV series he is portrayed by Stephen Dillane.

=== Joe Byrne ===
Joe Byrne is the head of the CIA, who has worked with Alex on three separate occasions. Unlike the more cold and manipulative Blunt, who was not above blackmailing Alex to accept missions for him, Byrne generally appeared more willing to simply ask Alex for help rather than forcing him to do something he didn't want to do, and displayed a strong respect for Alex when they worked together. During Scorpia Rising, he even trusted Alex despite Scorpia having attempted to frame Alex for an assassination attempt, even though Alex's story involved the existence of a boy who was basically Alex's clone (Julius Grief, given plastic surgery to resemble Alex back in Point Blanc).

In the Alex Rider TV series, Joe Byrne is reimagined as a woman and the Deputy CIA Jo Bryne, played by Rakie Ayola. This version of the character has no interaction with or knowledge of Alex.

=== Kyra Vashenko-Chao ===
Kyra Vashenko-Chao is an original character from the Alex Rider TV series, portrayed by Marli Siu. She is introduced as a student at Point Blanc, a secretive, reclusive, and introverted but eager and extremely talented computer hacker who suspects something is wrong with the school even before Alex gets there, and works with Alex to discover the truth and undermine Dr Greif's efforts. Alongside Jack Starbright and Tom Harris, Kyra is one of the few who knows about Alex's double life; after leaving Point Blanc, she finds herself crossing paths with Alex during every one of the situations he finds himself in, eventually becoming part of Alex's "team" alongside Tom Harris, where she serves as "tech support" or a deus ex machina to retcon certain aspects of the original books. Although usually somber and deadpan by nature, Kyra develops an attraction to Alex, pulling him into a kiss before he leaves to take down SCORPIA so that he "has something to come back to".

Kyra can be considered a composite of different female allies from the book series who have been interested in Alex: her computer skills and bemusement over Alex reflect Shadia Manzour from Never Say Die, her initially aloof demeanour and subsequent collaboration with Alex evokes Tamara Knight from Ark Angel, and her teasing and subdued infatuation with Alex are reminiscent of Sabina Pleasure, Alex's original love interest in the novels.

=== John Crawley ===
John Crawley has been described as an "office manager" for MI6, and often acts as a messenger between Alex Rider and Special Operations, such as delivering him to MI6 in Stormbreaker and Point Blanc, informing him of his mission in Skeleton Key, visiting him in hospital in Ark Angel and, most recently, leading the "Invisible Man" operation against Harold Bulman in Crocodile Tears. He is known to have worked with John Rider, Alex's father, on a number of occasions and is described as having "the kind of face you forget while you're still looking at it".

In the film adaption of Stormbreaker, he was portrayed by Jimmy Carr, with the character's name changed (by an unusual request from the real MI6) to "John Crawford". In the TV series, he is played by Ace Bhatti, once again under the name "John Crawley".

=== Ben Daniels ===
Ben Daniels is a minor protagonist who has appeared in Stormbreaker, Snakehead, Never Say Die and Nightshade Revenge. He first meets Alex at an SAS training camp in the Brecon Beacons, where Alex was sent by MI6 for training. In Snakehead, Ben secretly kills Anan Sukit, who was attempting to shoot Alex after he had beaten Sukit's fighter "Sunthorn" in an arena fight. Alex later meets Ben again, where he takes him to an MI6 outpost in Bangkok.

In Snakehead, it is revealed from his accent that he comes from Liverpool. His codename, depending on whenever the different editions of the books were published, is either "Fox" or "Wolf": in pre-2010 editions of the novels up to Snakehead he is "Fox", while in the later novels and in post-2010 editions of the earliest novels, he is often conflated with the character "Wolf".

In Nightshade Revenge, Alex assists Ben on his mission to first Nice and later San Francisco, Ben saving his life both times.

He is portrayed by Ben Peel in the series.

=== Paul Drevin ===
Paul Drevin is the son of Russian multibillionaire Nikolei Drevin, a minor antagonist of Ark Angel. Alex and Paul first meet in hospital, where Alex is recovering from a bullet wound, and Paul is recovering from appendicitis. When Force Three attempts to kidnap Paul, Alex is kidnapped instead after he pretends he is Paul. When Alex escapes from Force Three, Nikolei invites Alex to stay with them for a few days and view the launch of Ark Angel.

=== Tom Harris ===
Tom Harris is Alex's best friend at Brookland High School. He first appeared in the novel Scorpia, and has since appeared in Crocodile Tears, Scorpia Rising, Nightshade and Nightshade Revenge.

He is portrayed by Brenock O'Connor in the Alex Rider TV series, where he is shown to be an avid gamer and an aspiring filmmaker, and serves as a sort of team-mate to Alex.

=== Mrs. Jones ===
Lâle "Tulip" Jones is the former second-in-command at MI6 and was Alan Blunt's closest associate, before succeeding him in becoming head of MI6 following the events of Scorpia Rising. Blunt insists their personal and professional lives remain separate; consequently, Mrs. Jones has never even been inside of his house, despite knowing him better than anyone else in Special Operations. Unlike Alan Blunt, who openly forces and blackmails Alex into many of his missions, Mrs. Jones had always opposed using Alex and is reluctant of sending him on missions once she takes over from Blunt. Mrs. Jones has two children, both of whom have been taken by her undercover Russian spy husband, Hans Meyer, to Nightshade at a young age.

In the Stormbreaker film, she is played by Sophie Okonedo, and in the Alex Rider TV series she is played by Vicky McClure. Both portrayals omit her peculiar habit of chewing peppermints before she speaks with Alex: this is compared in the novels to a similar habit associated with Ernst Stavro Blofeld.

=== Tamara Knight ===
Tamara Knight is introduced in the novel Ark Angel as Nikolei Drevin's personal assistant. At first, she is cold towards Alex and she doesn't seem to like him at all. However, it was later revealed that she was working for the CIA when she saved Alex's life from drowning when he went scuba diving. Tamara softened towards him and they joined forces to stop Drevin's plans to destroy his Ark Angel space hotel. They were captured by Magnus Payne and the Force Three "freedom fighters", in fact mercenaries working for Drevin. Tamara was injured and was imprisoned. She was later rescued by Ed Shulsky and a CIA task force. She was the one who convinced Alex to go into space and stop Payne from setting off the bomb that would destroy Ark Angel.

=== Ali Manzour ===
Colonel Ali Manzour appears in Scorpia Rising and Never Say Die as the head of the Egyptian secret service. He is described as an overweight and stern but amiable and jocular man with a morbid sense of humor and a penchant for gold jewelry, wearing heavy rings on every finger, and takes a mixed approach towards intelligence work in general and Alex in particular – he is firm about operations and implies that he relishes the use of lethal force, but he also appears to have a soft spot for Alex, being alternately stern and doting towards him. Manzour is the first to recognize Alex's psychological trauma after the death of Jack Starbright (explicitly mentioning it to Joe Byrne) and is skeptical when Alex begins his own investigation into it. His daughter Shadia is a computer hacker working under him: it is implied that Manzour's soft spot towards Alex is because he has no sons of his own, although this is questionable – he claims to have two sons in Scorpia Rising, while in Never Say Die Shadia claims that she is one of four sisters and no brothers.

=== Sabina Pleasure ===
Sabina Pleasure is a protagonist who made her first appearance in the novel Skeleton Key and has gone on to appear in Eagle Strike, Snakehead, Crocodile Tears, Scorpia Rising, Never Say Die and Nightshade Revenge. She is romantically interested in Alex and has been supportive of his work as a teenage spy. Her parents are Edward Pleasure and Elizabeth “Liz” Pleasure.

In the film Stormbreaker, the character of Pleasure was portrayed by Sarah Bolger. In the Amazon Prime TV series, Pleasure is renamed Sabina Pleasance and is portrayed by Charithra Chandran.

=== Alex Rider ===
Alex Rider is the main character of the series.

Alex is an early teenage spy recruited by MI6. Known for his intelligence, athletic and fighting skills, all of which were trained by his uncle and the SAS, Alex is seen demonstrating karate, pickpocketing, climbing, surfing, swimming and more throughout the series. His skills have helped him escape death multiple times. He also speaks several languages, English, French, German and Spanish.

Alex's parents were killed when their private plane crashed – later revealed to have been caused by a bomb planted by Ash under Scorpia's orders; he was subsequently raised by his uncle Ian Rider, until Ian himself was killed when Alex was fourteen years old. After his uncle's death, MI6 allows Alex's best friend and housekeeper, Jack Starbright, to become his legal guardian. He is extremely close to Jack and was shattered by her “death” until he realised her death was faked by Julius and Razim. His close friends, and the only ones who know about his secret job as a spy, are Tom Harris and Sabina Pleasure.

Alex is described as strikingly good looking with an athletic build, dark brown eyes said to be “too serious for his face” and fair hair.

He is portrayed by Alex Pettyfer in the film Stormbreaker and Otto Farrant in the Amazon Prime TV series.

=== Helen Rider ===
Helen Rider (née Beckett) was Alex Rider's mother. She was killed, along with her husband, John Rider, when their best friend Ash, who was working for Scorpia, set a bomb on their private aeroplane. This happened while Alex was still an infant (he had a minor ear infection, so stayed behind), and his uncle, Ian Rider, became his legal guardian.

=== Ian Rider ===
Ian Rider is Alex's uncle and became his guardian after his parents died. He worked for MI6, undercover of being a banker. Ian and Alex had a very good relationship. They were very close, and when Ian was home they did practically everything together. Ian often took Alex around the world to educate him about other cultures. He never let Alex call him "uncle". Ian also taught him a lot of things that prepared him for being a spy, such as scuba diving, climbing and driving. He is killed at the beginning of Stormbreaker by Yassen Gregorovich. His death led Alex into working for MI6.

Ian Rider is played by Ewan McGregor in the film adaptation of Stormbreaker and Andrew Buchan in the Alex Rider TV series.

=== John Rider ===
John Rider was Alex Rider's father and an agent of MI6. It is revealed in the book Russian Roulette that John became double agent for MI6 and criminal organization Scorpia, and sought to infiltrate and destroy the latter. He briefly met and worked with a young Yassen Gregorovich in Scorpia, and managed to initially dissuade Yassen from becoming a contract killer. Scorpia discovering his MI6 association would later lead to his, and his wife's, death.

At Oxford University, Rider studied politics and economics, and was an excellent tennis player. He later joined the Parachute Regiment at Aldershot and served for three years, seeing action in both Northern Ireland and Gambia. John was awarded the Military Cross from the queen, as well as being promoted to the rank of Captain for carrying a wounded soldier to safety under fire during the attack on Goose Green, in the Falklands War.

=== Derek Smithers ===
Derek Smithers is a protagonist who has appeared in almost all of the novels, as well as in the screen adaptions. He creates the various gadgets for MI6 agents, a role similar to that of Q's in the James Bond films. Portrayed as jolly and enthusiastic from his overweight appearance, it is often implied that Smithers is one of Alex's two only genuine friends at MI6 (the other probably being Ben Daniels). For instance, in Eagle Strike, when Alex attempted to convince MI6 to investigate Damian Cray, he was ignored by Blunt and Mrs. Jones, but Smithers nevertheless supplied him with a high-tech bicycle that played a crucial role in Alex's investigations, and in Ark Angel Smithers took time out from his holiday to provide Alex with new gadgets when the CIA requested Alex's assistance in investigating the father of a new friend.

In Scorpia Rising, Smithers reveals that in reality, he was always privately opposed to involving Alex in MI6 in the first place; he believes that the world of spying is dangerous and dirty, and people like Ian Rider, who saw it as one big adventure, could easily get themselves killed. He, in the same instance, further reveals that his obese identity that Alex knew him all along for was actually an MI6 disguise, a fatsuit. His true identity ends up being a slender young adult, supposedly of Irish nationality. After he returns from Egypt, he semi-retires from working for MI6, becoming a private detective, although he does turn up in Nightshade Revenge, still in his fatsuit, to help Alex in his mission against Nightshade.

Smithers was portrayed by Stephen Fry in the Stormbreaker film, where his jovial nature and position were significantly downplayed, and Nyasha Hatendi in the Alex Rider TV series, where he is more involved in the day-to-day actions of the Department, serving as Mrs Jones' advisor alongside John Crawley.

=== James Sprintz ===
James Sprintz is a minor character in Point Blanc. When Alex arrives at Point Blanc Academy, James is the only boy who had not yet been imprisoned and replaced by a Dr. Grief clone. He becomes Alex's only friend at the academy. He often comments on the other boys' strange behaviour (who are, in reality, clones of Dr. Grief), and the day before he was captured and replaced, he had planned to escape Point Blanc. He is eventually freed by Alex and the SAS, along with the other real boys, when the school is raided.

In the series, his nationality is changed to Australian, and is portrayed by Earl Cave.

=== Jack Starbright ===
Jack Starbright is Alex Rider's closest and best friend, a 28-year-old American woman, originally Ian Rider's housekeeper and after his death Alex's legal guardian. She has appeared in every novel so far, with her most prominent roles being in Eagle Strike, Scorpia Rising and Never Say Die. She is described as slim, with tangled red hair, and a boyish, round face that "is always cheerful, even when in a bad mood". She has a crooked smile, and is described to look more like a big sister than a housekeeper.

In the Stormbreaker film adaptation, Jack is played by Alicia Silverstone, and in the Alex Rider TV series, she is played by Ronkẹ Adékoluẹjo.

=== American Secretary of State ===
The American Secretary of State is an unnamed minor character in the novel Scorpia Rising. She is described by Joe Byrne as a "hardliner," and is central to Scorpia agent Abdul Aziz al-Razim's plan to have the Elgin Marbles returned to Greece (and is apparently of Greek extract herself). A potential rival to the US president, the Secretary of State is in Egypt to make a speech denouncing Britain as a world power – a speech guaranteed to give her international attention.

=== Belinda Troy ===
Belinda Troy is a minor protagonist in Skeleton Key. She was a CIA agent partnered with Tom Turner (Glen Carver in the US version) and Alex Rider on a mission to Cuba to investigate General Alexei Sarov. She and Turner do not take to Alex, because he is a minor, and believe he is unnecessary and could put their mission in danger. When Turner is kidnapped on the Salesman's boat, it is hinted that she has feelings for him. She is killed in the same manner as Turner while attempting to infiltrate Sarov's headquarters. She is described as being "a couple of years older than he is (Turner), slim, with brown frizzy hair tumbling down to her shoulders".

=== Tom Turner ===
Tom Turner (named Glen Carver in older US versions of Skeleton Key) is a minor protagonist in Skeleton Key. Like Belinda Troy, he is a CIA agent, sent to Cuba with Troy and Alex, to investigate General Alexei Sarov. Turner and Troy object to Alex being sent with them. They often ignore his opinions and treat him as a hindrance, even after Alex saves Turner from The Salesman. He reveals nothing about his personal life, other than he is a former Marine, and dreams of dying for his country. He and Troy are killed when trying to infiltrate Sarov's headquarters through the "Devil's Chimney", a hidden underwater tunnel. They are killed by the traps which are disguised as stalactites. Turner is described as "about forty, a handsome man, with fair, close-cropped hair, blue eyes and a face that managed to be both tough and boyish". He is also mentioned (as Tom Turner) in the US versions of Ark Angel.

=== Wolf ===
Wolf is a minor character who appears as being initially hostile towards Alex in the novel Stormbreaker, but returns in a more protagonistic role for the novel Point Blanc. He also appears in the film adaption of Stormbreaker. He is first encountered by Alex while training with the SAS. He is part of "K Unit" along with Alex (Cub), and three other men, codenamed, Fox, Eagle, and Snake/Bear (Snake in the novel and TV series, Bear in the film).

He is portrayed by Ashley Walters in the Stormbreaker film adaptation, and by Howard Charles in the Television series.

=== Rahim ===
Rahim is a minor character who appears in the novel Crocodile Tears. Rahim is an Indian RAW agent who had been sent to kill Desmond McCain both at his Scottish castle and in Africa to avenge the destruction of the Jowada Power Station. Rahim finds Alex, Sabina and her father when their SUV falls into Loch Arkaig and drives them to the hospital, saving them from hypothermia. Alex later meets the agent again when Rahim kills Myra Beckett and saves Alex from falling into the pack of crocodiles. He had injured his leg when he parachuted into a thornbush, and cannot help Alex destroy the dam that will flood the crops and stop McCain's virus. Alex takes Rahim's plastic explosive that was given to the agent to destroy McCain's aeroplane. Rahim returns to save Alex a third time in McCain's crop duster, after Alex is caught in the raging waters of the destroyed dam. As Rahim and Alex land at a nearby airport, he is shot and killed by McCain.

== Main antagonists ==
=== Ash ===
Anthony Sean Howell, more commonly referred to as Ash (his initials), is a major character in Snakehead.

Ash was born in England and worked for MI6 with his best friend John Rider. When John went undercover within Scorpia, Ash was assigned to monitor his progress from a distance in case his friend got into difficulty. Ash was chosen to lead the mission to "capture" John, when he and Yassen Gregorovich were sent to kill a target in Malta. However, the mission was a near total disaster; due to confusion with two clocks that were out of sync, John and Yassen's arrival took Ash by surprise. When Yassen shot Ash, his body armour meant that he was back on his feet in seconds, but this prompted Yassen to fatally shoot four other agents. Ash pursued Yassen, but was left for dead when he was stabbed by the Russian. Ash only survived this injury when John Rider risked his life to provide emergency first aid. Ash was left with half his stomach gone, and was demoted for his failure. He eventually quit his job because he thought his demotion was unfair and was not satisfied with desk duty. He then went to work for ASIS in Australia.

Alex Rider first meets him in Snakehead when he wanders into a minefield. Ash tells him not to move and leaves, claiming he will get help. This was later found to be a test, to see how Alex would react. Alex discovers that Ash is his godfather after meeting with Ethan Brooke, head of Covert Action for ASIS. The prospect of learning more about his past lures Alex into working for ASIS, alongside Ash, investigating the ruthless Snakehead. They are sent on a mission together to infiltrate the Snakehead by posing as Afghan refugees trying to gain the Snakehead's help in illegally immigrating to Australia. However Major Yu is on to them from the start, so both are captured in Darwin. Alex is sent to a surgery where his organs will be illegally harvested, whilst Ash vanishes along with the Major.

At the end of Snakehead, when Major Yu's oil rig is attacked by a joint British/Australian taskforce, Ash is shot by Ben Daniels, and is then revealed to have been working for SCORPIA since Malta, and had blown Alex's cover before their mission had even started. Alex deduces that Ash was responsible for the death of his parents. Ash confesses to having planted a bomb on their plane, on which they were going to France to start a new life; Alex remained behind due to an ear infection. Ash expresses some regret for his actions before dying from his injuries. Scorpia had already been betrayed once by John Rider and so they put his loyalty to the test by commanding him to place the bomb in position. It is also revealed that Ash had a minor crush on Alex's mother, a charming and beautiful nurse.

Ash is described as having "black curly hair and the beginnings of a rough beard" and has a slight Australian accent. He also has a large scar along his stomach, the result of his encounter with Yassen Gregorovich, a Russian assassin. He had a brief relationship with Jack Starbright, Alex's housekeeper and legal guardian. He is seen smoking at several points in the book, his name possibly being a reference to this. Alex also notes that it is surprising that Ash smokes, considering the fact that he chooses to look after himself in so many other ways.

His role in the series has been compared to that of Alec Trevelyan (aka Agent 006/ Janus) from the James Bond movie GoldenEye.

=== Damian Cray ===
Damian Cray is the main antagonist of Eagle Strike.

Cray was born in North London on 5 October 1950, and baptised as Harold Eric Lunt, the only child of Sir Arthur Lunt, a rich businessman who made his name in building multi-storey car parks. Although he desired to be a pop or rock star, his parents sent him to the Royal Academy of Music in London. He sang there with a young Elton John. When he was thirteen, his parents died in a bizarre accident in which their car fell on them, obviously Cray's doing. Although he welcomed their deaths, he pretended to be distraught and left the Royal Academy to travel the world. He changed his name and became Buddhist and vegetarian.

He returned to England in the 1970s and enjoyed a hugely successful music career, starting a band called "Slam!” (a parody of Wham!). This shot him to fame at once. At the end of the 1970s, the band split up and he started a solo career. His first solo album, "Firelight", went platinum and he won several awards and released the single "Something for the Children" at Christmas time in 1986, with all funds given to charity. Cray campaigned for several issues, including saving the rainforests, ending world debt and banning animal testing. His tireless work for charity earned him a knighthood in 1990. The rich superstar then branched into hotels, television, and even started developing "Gameslayer", the most advanced and realistic game console of its time.

However, despite his charitable work and beliefs, Cray had a darker and more sinister side to him; to fulfill some of his charitable notions, such as his campaigns against animal testing, whaling and landmines, he ordered the assassinations of many people responsible for the practises he was campaigning against. This went unnoticed until he called for a hit on Edward Pleasure – father of Sabina Pleasure – a journalist who was threatening to expose Cray's plan. He also orchestrates the killing of a journalist who puts him on the spot by asking him awkward questions regarding video game violence in "Gameslayer".

Cray was planning a nuclear attack to annihilate the major drug-producing parts of the world, killing millions in the process. Under the cover of "Gameslayer" he devised a way of hijacking Air Force One using a flash drive and launching the USA's supply of nuclear missiles. However, Alex has trouble convincing Alan Blunt that Damian Cray is planning to destroy half of the world due to the fact that Cray is considered charitable by MI6, forcing Alex to investigate the situation himself.

After Alex discovers how to sneak into Cray's Gameslayer development centre in Amsterdam, he overhears a conversation between Cray and Charlie Roper, an American NSA agent. It is eventually revealed that Roper made a flash drive capable of hacking into any computer in the world. After taking the flash drive, Cray kills Roper by locking him in a glass case and showering two million dollars' worth of nickels onto him in lieu of payment. Cray captures Alex with the help of Yassen Gregorovich, although he later escapes and returns to England, only to find that Sabina has been taken hostage.

Cray takes the two teenagers with him when his men seize Air Force One, and shoots Gregorovich when the Russian refuses to kill the children. He then fires at Alex, seemingly killing him, and gets into a fight with Sabina. This is interrupted when Alex recovers (having worn a bulletproof vest), and with Sabina, shoves Cray out of the plane and into one of the turbines, vaporising him instantly and forcing the pilot (Henryk) to make a crash landing.

Cray is described as very short, with dyed jet-black hair. He has a round face, green eyes, with a small nose positioned "almost unnaturally in the centre of his face". It is mentioned that Cray has probably had plastic surgery in an attempt to look young.

His character and manner of death is very similar to that of Gustav Graves from the James Bond movie Die Another Day. Coincidentally, Toby Stephens, who portrayed Graves in the Bond movie, portrays Damian Cray in the Alex Rider TV series, reimagined as an Elon Musk-esque tech mogul instead of a singer. His TV counterpart is more sympathetic, as it is revealed his war against drugs is because his older brother died of an overdose. The way he obtained the nuclear launch codes is also different: instead of using Gameslayer console production as a front for Roper's work and concentrating it into a flash drive, Cray has designed the Feathered Serpent game itself in such a way that once everyone logs on to the game, it becomes a supercomputer that obtains the nuclear launch codes. Also, instead of getting sucked to his demise in the turbines, he is shot dead by Yassen Gregorovitch.

=== Darcus Drake ===
Darcus Drake is the main antagonist of the short story Alex in Afghanistan. He is an Irish newspaper correspondent-turned-terrorist leader.

Drake was born and raised in Dublin and spent five years working for the Irish Times before moving to London. He then worked for the international press as a war correspondent and photographer, winning several awards and becoming rich. His work took him to such places as Iraq, Sudan, Libya, Yemen and Ethiopia, and he went with scant regard for his own safety. According to Mrs Jones, Drake had "a knack of capturing horror in a way that made you want to look".

However, Drake's line of work soon sharpened his interest in terrorism, thinking that the West was utterly responsible for the destruction that he had photographed, until he vanished two years before the events of Alex in Afghanistan, becoming a terrorist and founding his own group, known simply as "the Awakening". Operating from the Falcon's Edge citadel in the Herat mountains, close to the Afghanistan-Iran border, which had been variously used by Alexander the Great, the British in the nineteenth century and the Soviets, Drake plans to unite all terrorist groups and freedom fighters in the Middle East into the Awakening, in order to drive the West out of the region forever.

Mrs Jones and John Crawley approach Alex (who has no school for a time following the fire caused by his clone), and convince him to go to Falcon's Edge, supposedly to photograph a calutron left over from the Soviet era, over fears that Drake is trying to activate it to supply terrorists with nuclear weapons. Alex is seemingly betrayed by his ally, Faisal, and handed over to Drake, who, over breakfast, reveals his plans to Alex. Drake announces that he doesn't need the calutron, and reveals the first act of the Awakening will be to have Alex executed by firing squad at sunset, in order to show the West what it is doing in that region, as well as to show that the Awakening exists.

Drake has Alex imprisoned, but Faisal (who is revealed to be on Alex's side the whole time) frees him from his cell. Alex steals a horse, and parachutes with it out of Falcon's Edge, trying to make for the Shuja Cemetery (a prearranged meeting point for when the mission concludes). Drake sends twelve men from his personal guard to kill Alex, but his Kuchi allies, Faisal included, kill all the pursuers, saving Alex, before they escort him out of the country.

In London, Alan Blunt and Mrs Jones trick Alex into thinking that his mission had failed, prompting him to leave. However, it is revealed that one of Alex's gadgets (a very powerful Leica camera to photograph the calutron) contains a homing beacon, in order for MI6 to locate Drake and kill him. An RAF jet is promptly launched, and fires two Brimstone missiles that home in on the beacon, killing Drake before a meeting of the Awakening can take place.

Drake is described as being in his mid-thirties, unshaven, with silver hair, a slim build and a handsome face. He also suffers from Mobius Syndrome, causing his face to be permanently smiling, something he despises, saying that "I've been smiling all my life even though I've never found very much to smile about".

=== Nikolei Drevin ===
Nikolei Vladimir Drevin is the main antagonist of Ark Angel. Drevin is a famed Russian oligarch, owning many hotels, businesses, and even a football team, Stratford East. While generally viewed as a philanthropist, his wealth was actually attained through deals with several criminal organisations.He does not like losing, and is prepared to kill to win. He is the mastermind behind the Ark Angel space hotel project.

Born in Russia during the rule of the Soviet Union, Drevin apparently served in the KGB. When Communism collapsed during 1989–91, Drevin used his former contacts in the Russian Mafia, the Japanese yakuza and the Chinese Triads to seize Russia's oil supplies for himself at a quarter of their usual prices, conning the Russian government out of its natural assets. He soon became, thanks to his criminal activities and his ownership of Russian oil, one of the richest men in the world.

The CIA is building up a case against Drevin, storing all of their evidence in The Pentagon in Washington. Meanwhile, Drevin's Ark Angel project went over-budget, and he decided to also destroy it to get some insurance out of it instead of maintaining the project further. It is revealed that he plans to solve both these problems by blowing Ark Angel out of orbit with a bomb as it passes above Washington. The falling space station, guided towards Washington, would serve two purposes: destroy the Pentagon, with all its evidence against Drevin, and destroy the space station itself and claim some insurance. To prevent himself from being accused of sabotaging the project, he hired some men to form Force Three, a fake group of eco-terrorists, which will be blamed for Ark Angel's destruction.

Drevin becomes acquainted with Alex Rider when Alex saves his son, Paul Drevin, from Force Three. (Drevin eventually revealed that the 'attack' on Paul was intended to draw attention away from any possible connection between him and Force Three). He then invites Alex over for "two weeks of the most luxury you have ever had". Later en route to Flamingo Bay, Alex is informed by the CIA of Drevin's criminal activities and is sent in to spy on him. Drevin discovers Alex's assignments with MI6 and orders his head of security, Magnus Payne, to kill him.

Later, Drevin, while trying to shoot Alex, accidentally wounds his own son, Paul. Infuriated, he clambers aboard his seaplane to try to escape. Unknown to him, however, Alex had tied two canoes to the plane's floats. The canoes become tangled in the trees, causing Drevin to crash, killing him. As for his plan, Alex is able to move the bomb to the centre of Ark Angel, so that it simply blows the structure apart.

=== Dr. Raymond Feng ===
Dr. Raymond Feng is the main antagonist of the short story Spy Trap. Nearly nothing is known about him.

When first introduced, Feng is supposedly a psychiatrist attached to MI6, assessing Alex after a supposed car crash that took place at the end of the Murmansk incident in Skeleton Key, shortly after Alex returned to the UK. Alex wakes up, suffering with amnesia, in Bellhanger Abbey, ostensibly a rest home used by MI6, and is taken to see Feng in his office. Feng tells Alex to tell him about himself, including his background and how his uncle, Ian Rider, trained him for his life in MI6, as well as the events of Skeleton Key and other aspects of his life. However, Feng lets slip several inconsistencies, such as not knowing who Alan Blunt (the head of MI6 Special Operations) is, and saying that the car Alex was in hit a traffic light, when his underling, Wendy McDarling, saying the crash happened on a motorway.

Soon, Alex pieces together what happened, after investigating Bellhanger Abbey, and through his own memories when they emerge: John Crawley met him after he returned from Murmansk; they drove home in a chauffeur-driven car (the chauffeur is later revealed to be Karl); the car did not crash, but instead was driven into a truck's trailer; the car was then flooded with knockout gas, leading to Alex waking up at the Abbey. Alex's investigations reveal Crawley in another room, completely drugged and unable to move or speak intelligibly.

Alex decides to break out of Bellhanger Abbey, after he finds his mobile phone, which Feng said was destroyed in the phony car crash, undamaged. He steals fishing lines, ties them to the security drone and uses them to fashion a zip wire to glide over the electric fence. However, the security guards discover this, and Feng orders everyone at Bellhanger Abbey to pursue Alex into the forest and kill him. Alex is rescued by MI6, who storm the Abbey and arrest Feng and his surviving underlings. It is revealed, after interrogation, that Feng is in the pay of an unknown country's intelligence service (China and Russia are both mentioned), and that he is refusing to talk. It is also implied that his real name might not be Raymond Feng.

Feng is described as being Chinese, as well as being "very round and fat, with black hair going grey at the sides and a small beard that began under his lower lip and reached about an inch under his chin", as well as having "slab-like teeth that looked false". He drives an orange-coloured Lada, and has an interest in fishing. He also suffers from Photophobia in both his eyes, requiring him to wear dark glasses at all times; he alleges to have inherited his eye problem from both his parents, as his father had photophobia in his right eye, while his mother had it in her left eye.

=== Yassen Gregorovich ===
Yassen Gregorovich is a recurring villain in the series, appearing in Stormbreaker, Eagle Strike, and Russian Roulette. He is also mentioned in Scorpia and Snakehead. In the end of Stormbreaker he saves the life of Alex Rider by shooting Herod Sayle on a helicopter pad. He was a Russian-born contract killer, trained by, and apparently working for, the clandestine terrorist organisation Scorpia. A superb assassin, Yassen was believed to be one of the world's best.

Born in Russia as Yasha Gregorovich, Yassen's father was killed by an accident of a biochemical warfare project that was hushed up by the Russian Government. His mother died when the Russian government bombed the village and set it on fire. After his parents' deaths, Yassen, then 14, made his way to Moscow in search of a family friend, Misha Dementyev, who attempts to hand Yassen over to the Soviet police. Yassen manages to escape and then ran errands for a group of thieves, with the leader a boy of 17 named Dimitry who originally stole the bulk of Yasha's money when he arrived. In a desperate heist, Yassen breaks into someone's apartment, but is caught by the owner, Vladimir Sharkovsky. Later, Sharkovsky interviews Yassen. But Yasha is hurt in the mouth, and pronounces his name "Yassen". After four long years of being forced to work for Sharkovsky, an assassin breaks in and shoots Sharkovsky, apparently killing him. Yassen holds the assassin at gunpoint and forces him to take him (Yassen) away from Vladimir's mansion in which he worked. The assassin worked for Scorpia and Yassen joins up. In the very end, Yassen goes back to Sharkovsky's mansion to prove John Rider (Alex's father) wrong about him. He then loads five chambers of Sharkovsky's revolver and places it to his head and shoots, seeing it as his last chance to leave the path of a killer. Yassen once again survives, and kills Sharkovsky. He resolves to become a professional killer to prove John's beliefs about him wrong.

For all his skills, Yassen is obviously best known for his assassinations; throughout the series, his reputation seems to be one of a man who makes no mistakes, and he is considered an active threat by MI6. He has been employed by Iraq, Serbia, Libya, and China. It is suggested that his training included, as is demonstrated on a single occasion when he convinces Alex not to shoot him by describing what will happen when he pulls the trigger, basic psychological warfare. He was also an expert with conventional weaponry and terrorist techniques, though both are demonstrated only once throughout the series before his death. Yassen made another appearance (in a scene set in the past) in the seventh book of the series, Snakehead. He was fluent in nine languages and was learning Japanese at the time of his death, while working with Damian Cray.

Yassen was at least partially instructed by Alex Rider's late father, Ian's brother, John Rider, an MI6 agent under deep cover working as an unspecified instructor for Scorpia on the Italian island of Malagosto. Yassen is in debt to John Rider; during a joint assignment in the Amazon, Rider, under the alias of Hunter, saved his student's life by shooting a black widow spider that had crawled onto Yassen's throat, killing their planned target with the same bullet. Although it left a notable scar on Yassen's neck, it was something which Yassen never forgot. Though Alex does not initially realise the reason, Yassen demonstrates some care for the boy, on more than one occasion sparing his life when he could have easily killed him. Before his death, Yassen actually tells Alex he respected John Rider and is glad that his son (Alex) could be with him in the last moments of his life.

He was shot and killed by his then-employer Damian Cray after he refused to kill Alex and Sabina, claiming that he did not kill children (though evidence in the last book would suggest it had more to do with his reluctance to kill Alex). However he lived long enough to tell Alex to find Scorpia in Venice.

Yassen Gregorovich is described as attractive, having blonde hair (red hair in the Stormbreaker film and dark hair in the series), pale blue eyes, pale skin, distinctly chiselled lips, and "almost feminine eyelashes". He also has a long, distinctive scar along his neck (a result of the aforementioned incident with the black widow). Yassen's relaxed and graceful poise is often compared to that of a dancer.

He is portrayed by Damian Lewis in the film and Thomas Levin in the series; in the series, Yassen is a recurring character who frequently crosses paths with Alex, even "mentoring" him when he joins SCORPIA.

=== Dr. Hugo Grief ===
Dr. Hugo Grief (real name: Johannes de Leede) is the main antagonist of Point Blanc. He was born in South Africa, where he was head of biology department at the University of Johannesburg. He went on to become South Africa's minister for science while still in his twenties. In this position, he discovered how to clone humans, perfecting the process by experimenting on political prisoners, due to his senior role in BOSS. Grief was also racist, disgusted by how black people and Nelson Mandela became the leaders of South Africa, feeling they would run his country into the ground. He thought that South Africa was excellent when controlled by the white men and thus decided to try to rule the world, and reinstate apartheid globally. Grief believed that he could rule the earth if he could control the main industries, such as technology and food.

To achieve this, Grief devised "The Gemini Project". Using money stolen from the South African government in 1981, he bought a castle in the French Alps and, along with assistant Eva Stellenbosch, turned the castle into an underground laboratory where he cloned himself sixteen times. Grief then turned the castle into a school, Point Blanc, for the rebellious sons of rich families. He intended to use plastic surgery on his clones to make them resemble the real boys who were sent to him by their parents. Grief would then send the clones back to the parents – assuming that any minor 'differences' between his clones and the originals would be taken as nothing more than the natural changes the boys would have gone through during their time away, and when the parents died the clones inherit their businesses. However, two men became suspicious about their sons' (the clones) changed personalities, and contacted Grief, who had them killed by The Gentleman. The possible link between the two deaths, coupled with messages that Alan Blunt had exchanged with one of the fathers – the two men having become friends at university – lead to MI6 sending Alex Rider to Point Blanc to investigate under the name of Alex Friend, resulting in Alex discovering the truth.

After discovering Grief's plan, Alex escapes Point Blanc by snowboarding down the mountain, and MI6 fakes his death after Alex crashes into a fence. Within 24 hours, he returns to the academy with an SAS attack force. With his plan in tatters, Grief attempts to escape by helicopter, but Alex climbs onto a snowmobile and speeds up a ramp. When he is about to reach the edge, he leaps off, sending the empty snowmobile flying into Grief's helicopter and causing a fatal, explosive crash. After his death, the clone meant to replace Alex attacks the real Alex at his school, but Alex fends off the attack, resulting in a fire starting and the clone (Julius Grief) presumed dead. In Scorpia Rising, it is revealed that Julius had survived, albeit with burn injuries. It is also mentioned that the other fifteen clones have been sent to various facilities around the world to give them psychiatric treatment, reasoning that they were made into their current state rather than choosing to be monsters, but at the time of Scorpia Rising, two of the clones are dead and the others show little sign of responding to therapy.

When Alex encountered him, Grief was almost sixty years old. He is described as having "white paper skin" and wears red-tinted spectacles. It is quite likely that he is an albino, to emphasise his white superiority ideas, and the red-tinted spectacles could be a reference to albinistic eyes. His appearance is often compared to that of a skeleton. He moves as if "every bone in his body had been broken and then put back together again". Despite this, he has "beautifully manicured fingernails". Grief was also portrayed as insane by deciding to kill Alex by using him as a live human dissection in a biology class for the clones. Grief was also an admirer of several dictators, such as Adolf Hitler, Napoleon Bonaparte, Joseph Stalin and Julius Caesar, with this admiration being reflected in the names of some of his clones.

In the series, Grief (renamed Dr Hugo Marius Greif) is portrayed by Haluk Bilginer: despite being South African, just as his book counterpart was, the TV version does not support apartheid, which could in part be because it would not be easy to have somebody from the apartheid era to be a practical villain in the 2020s; this is further hinted at with Greif having worked as a research scientist in his native South Africa and in Turkey, but being expelled from both countries due to ethical violations. Greif idolises various dictators (now including Mao Zedong as well as Hitler and Stalin), believing that genocide and a general reduction of the human population is required to allow humanity to thrive. Moreover, the number of clones is reduced from sixteen in the book to eight in the series, and Point Blanc teaches both boys and girls, as opposed to being a boys-only school as in the original novel: this is explained in the series as Greif "tweaking the chromosomes before mitosis" in order to create female clones. The TV clones, whilst resembling their counterparts physically, can easily be identified as duplicates. Another key difference is that Grief does not die in a helicopter explosion, but is captured alive by the British, and reveals almost nothing to them. Whilst being transferred to gaol, he is killed by Yassen Gregorovich, who uses a neurotoxin bomb that also kills the MI6 agents guarding Greif in the car.

=== Julius Grief ===
Julius Grief is first seen in Point Blanc, where he is an antagonist, and also in Scorpia Rising as the clone of Dr. Hugo Grief. He was given plastic surgery to resemble Alex – while posing as Alex Friend, son of billionaire supermarket owner David Friend – in Point Blanc. He is named after Julius Caesar. After Dr. Grief's "Gemini Project" fails and he is killed, Julius evades capture and turns up at Alex's school. His attempt to kill Alex starts a fire in a classroom, and he is believed to have been killed, but he actually survived and was sent to a top-secret prison in Gibraltar. In Scorpia Rising, Scorpia are able to arrange for Julius to escape the prison, faking his death in the process, as part of a plan to frame Alex for an assassination and blackmail MI6 with the resulting information.

Psychiatric tests noted that Julius, although raised as a skilled fighter, was also insanely obsessed with revenge against Alex, made even worse by the fact that he constantly sees his enemy's face in the mirror. Julius joins Razim's pain projects and captures Alex for Razim, expressing an interest in joining Scorpia (although Razim actually plans to kill Julius once his current role is over). Alex is tied up for one of Razim's experiments, and Julius tortures him by seemingly killing Jack Starbright, by detonating the bomb in the car she steals while escaping from Razim's fortress. After the attempt to kill the US Secretary of State fails when Alex distracts him at a crucial moment, Julius flees with Alex not far behind him. A taxi hits Julius and he is injured, and although Alex gives him a chance to live, Julius's final attempt to kill Alex forces Alex to shoot him in self-defence, marking the second time Alex ever deliberately killed someone, the first time being Reverend Desmond McCain in Crocodile Tears.

Julius's deep hatred for Alex has often hinted that he was intended to be Alex's archenemy: his hatred is compounded by the fact that he looks perfectly identical to Alex, and is thus constantly reminded of how Alex beat him; the only notable difference between them is scratches around Julius' eyes from the hatred driving him to attempt to claw his eyes out. Julius is also described as being particularly susceptible to sunburn.

Although he does not physically appear in the novel due to his death in Scorpia Rising, Julius had a strong influence in Nightshade in which Alex goes undercover as him in the Gibraltar prison so he could get close to Freddy Grey and follow him to Nightshade. While there, Alex discovers that Julius had made enemies at the prison and created his own escape plan before being broken out by SCORPIA, which he uses to escape himself, along with Freddy. Alex later tries to "join" Nightshade to build trust, but has his cover blown by Dominic Royce. Nightshade then uses him to start a diversion away from their plan, claiming that he really is "Julius", and causing law enforcement to focus on finding him.

In the Alex Rider TV series, Otto Farrant, who portrays Alex, also portrays the clone Alex (whose name is never revealed).

=== Grimaldi Twins ===
Giovanni and Eduardo Grimaldi, also nicknamed "Gio" ("Guido" in other publications) and "Eddie" by each other, make an appearance Scorpia Rising and are the main antagonists of Never Say Die. They are ex-Mafia boss identical twin brothers who served on SCORPIA's executive board before it was disbanded, and ended up evading the authorities while most of the other remaining SCORPIA members were arrested. They are always together and have a tendency to finish each other's sentences, and they ordered the murder of their own father, Mafia boss Carlo Grimaldi, and took over his business, which itself was inherited from Carlo's parents, who were numbers one and two on the FBI's Most Wanted list. Unfortunately, they made a great deal of enemies from this moment on, not understanding mafia laws, and ended up losing a lot of their wealth in doing so, which eventually led them to join SCORPIA until the point of its collapse.

Desperately in need of money in order to sustain their luxurious lifestyle, as well as to begin a new SCORPIA, the twins hatch a scheme named Operation Steel Claw, involving the hijacking of an extremely large and expensive helicopter (a Super Stallion) from the United States Air Force with a strong electromagnet attached, with which they pick up a school bus filled with children from wealthy families, which would them be put on a moving Standard Class 5 steam locomotive called The Midnight Flyer that would transport the bus to a disused coke plant where the children will be held for a two hundred sixty million dollar ransom. Alex Rider becomes involved in their affairs after receiving an email from Jack Starbright, claiming that she's still alive, and Alex encounters the Grimaldi twins during his search for her. After failing to kill Alex with cement shoes, the twins take the children to an abandoned factory complex in Wales, along with Jack, whom they had saved from Abdul-Aziz Al-Rahim in order to use her to keep the children under control.

Alex manages to avoid the Grimaldi twins' henchmen and reunite with Jack, and the two of them succeed in rescuing the children by driving the school bus along a disused railway track. However, the Grimaldi twins soon give chase in The Midnight Flyer and desperately attempt to kill Alex with machine-guns, but Alex fills a thermos flask with leaking diesel fuel from the bus before throwing it into the funnel of the locomotive. Seconds later, the thermos explodes, causing the train to derail and crash into the cliff face the tunnel bored through, the wreck explodes and kills the Grimaldi twins.

Giovanni was born first, with Eduardo following five seconds later. Similarly, when Alex caused their train to crash and explode, Giovanni died first, with Eduardo following five seconds later.

In terms of appearances, the twins are identical in every respect, wearing the same clothes, eating the same food at the same time, sleeping at the same time for the same time, and owning the same cars and the same guns. The only way they can be told apart is that they have different dominant hands: Giovanni is left-handed, whilst Eduardo is right-handed, which can add to the illusion that they are mirror images of one another, as shown in their first scene in Never Say Die where they eat breakfast by the swimming pool at their villa, sitting opposite one another, appearing like one man and his reflection. Both are described as being very "neat and delicate, almost like schoolboys, with very round heads and black hair that could have been painted on, coming down in cowlicks over their foreheads", but very unattractive, with dark "always suspicious" eyes, very small mouths and permanent dark stubble across their faces, "like sandpaper", giving them an almost devilish appearance.

=== Razim ===
Razim, whose name used to be Abdul-Aziz Al-Rahim, is the main antagonist in Scorpia Rising. He is a former member of Saddam Hussein's secret police, the Mukharabat and an ex al-Qaeda terrorist after abandoning Iraq right before its invasion. He then left al-Qaeda after killing his superior when it was suggested that he become a suicide bomber, as he had no interest in dying for a cause he never believed in, and only joined the group because he enjoyed planning acts of terrorism. He is a new member of Scorpia and a complete sociopath. This is shown when he was mentioned to have strangled his own pet dog just to see how he feels and when he had turned his entire family in for execution to Saddam Hussein's secret police. He wants to create a measurement of pain with a quantifiable unit called the "Razim". Razim was chosen by Zeljan Kurst to run operation "Horseman", to deliver the Elgin Marbles to Greece. His plan was to plant a trail that would lead MI6 to a school in Cairo, have Alex sent to spy there, and then kill him after Alex's 'clone' Julius Grief – in fact a clone of Doctor Hugo Grief who was given plastic surgery to resemble Alex – had assassinated the anti-British American Secretary of State during a visit to Cairo. Afterward, he intended to blackmail London with evidence of them recruiting Alex – he arranged the assassination because otherwise MI6 might have been willing to go public as all of Alex's past assignments involved him saving thousands of innocent people and were hence essentially commendable – thus forcing them to return the Elgin Marbles. After Alex (Pretending to be Grief) opens the doors to Razim's fort to let the secret services in, Razim suddenly feels all the emotions he never felt before: grief, despair, anger. Razim is eventually killed in a fight with Alex by falling into a large pile of salt, which drags him in like quicksand and eventually penetrates his skin, causing a reaction similar to that of a snail.

His lack of emotion is very similar to Viktor Zokas/Renard from the James Bond movie The World Is Not Enough. Moreover, his manner of death echoes what happened to Dr Julius No in the novel Dr. No. He is referred to by name in the series as a member of Scorpia, but his voice actor is not credited.

=== Zeljan Kurst ===
Zeljan Kurst is a Yugoslavian businessman, the chairman of the terrorist organisation SCORPIA and one of the series' main antagonists. Kurst was the head of the police force in Yugoslavia during the early 1980s, and had been famous for his love of classical music (particularly Mozart) and extreme violence. It is said that he would interrogate prisoners with an opera or a symphony playing in the background and any prisoners who survived his brutal questioning would not be able to listen to whatever piece he had played ever again. Seeing the break-up of his country on the horizon, he fled before the arrival of democracy so he wouldn't be tried for crimes against humanity. Lacking any family, friends, or anywhere he could call home, he rambled around Eastern Europe for years, participating in small-time criminal ventures. During these years, he met Max Grendel, Julia Rothman and Winston Yu – all criminals in similar situations to his – and together they formed SCORPIA, a worldwide criminal syndicate, with Grendel as their first leader. Following Grendel's death at the beginning of the novel Scorpia, Kurst becomes the organization's leader and, though he does not physically appear in the novel, he assigns Rothman to oversee Operation Invisible Sword.

In his first physical appearance, during the novel Snakehead, Kurst devises an operation dubbed Reef Encounter to destroy a small Australian island in which an anti-poverty conference is being held, by planting a powerful non-nuclear, British-made bomb called Royal Blue along a tectonic fault line to create a tsunami that will obliterate the island, as well as a considerable part of the west coast of northern Australia. After Kurst has his agents acquire Royal Blue, he puts the operation under the control of Winston Yu, who will have his snakehead, the most powerful criminal organisation in South East Asia, smuggle the bomb to the fault line. Kurst supervises Yu's progress throughout the novel, and when Alex Rider is found to be investigating Yu's snakehead, he advises the Major not to repeat Julia Rothman's mistake of underestimating Rider's abilities, referencing the boy's success in thwarting operation Invisible Sword during the novel Scorpia.

Kurst meets Yu publicly on at least one occasion in the novel, so Yu can brief him on the progress of the operation. Kurst owns and operates a funeral parlor business which has a secret room that serves as a conference room for Scorpia in London. Unlike most members of Scorpia, Kurst treats Rider with caution, despite his age, knowing that he was responsible for many of Scorpia's failures.

In Scorpia Rising, Kurst masterminds a new plot after a Greek millionaire asks him to return the Elgin Marbles to him. Kurst plans to use Alex Rider and MI6's use of him to obtain that objective. The plan is to use Julius Grief (the clone made of Alex during Point Blanc, who wants revenge against Alex) to assassinate the American Secretary of State in Egypt and frame Alex for it, killing him along the way, and then blackmail the British government with the knowledge of MI6's use of a teenage boy unless they turn over the Elgin Marbles. He assigned a new member of the Scorpia board, Abdul-Aziz Al-Rahim, to carry it out. Board member Levi Kroll expresses opposition to the plan in the meeting and, pointing a gun at Kurst, threatens to leave. Kurst orders his assassination through the use of a sniper before using his body to attract MI6's attention on a school in Cairo where they will inevitably send Alex.

Unlike with operations Invisible Sword and Reef Encounter, Kurst decides to follow this operation more closely to prevent mistakes; it is this closer link with the plot that eventually proves his undoing. The plan fails and ends in the deaths of Razim, Julius Grief and Erik Gunter. While he tries to flee to his safe house in Siberia, Kurst is arrested by the Interpol and put on trial for several criminal charges. After Kurst's arrest, Scorpia is officially disbanded.

Kurst, Yassen Gregorovich, the Grimaldi twins, Julius Grief, Nightshade and Dominic Royce are the only major antagonists who are not introduced and killed in the same book. Kurst himself is also, along with Royce in both cases, the only main antagonist who is not killed at all and the only main antagonist that Alex never even comes into contact with. Furthermore, his role of being a criminal mastermind is similar to Ernst Stavro Blofeld's, the latter being the head of the James Bond organisation SPECTRE.

=== Jon Lucas ===
Jon Lucas is, together with the Nightshade teachers, one of the main antagonists of Nightshade Revenge. Lucas was once a brogrammer for the multi-billion-dollar software company Real Time; specialising in augmented reality, he was the chief designer for their games Trigger Happy and Eden Fall and the mastermind behind their eSports space, the Arena, until he was fired from the company by CEO Rudolf Klein for his habit of cutting costs and forsaking safety features from the software and hardware after his actions resulted in a series of harmful incidents on various users, most notably a soldier temporarily going blind after using one of his headsets.

Seeking revenge, Lucas infected the Eden Fall programming with malware allowing him to remotely manipulate the game, adding or removing hazards and obstacles which could lead players to their deaths in what would look like freak accidents. Lucas tampered with the game remotely from a master server room at El Dorado, a replica Wild West town built on his ranch just outside San Francisco: his intention was to inflict thousands of fatal and near-fatal incidents to players and overwhelm hospitals worldwide, intending to eventually bankrupt Klein and Real Time through the copious amounts of lawsuits, eventually allowing Lucas to buy out the company and merge it with his own business empire, taking back what he believes to be rightfully his.

One of the deaths resulting from Lucas’ malware was Colin White, son of multimillionaire art dealer Wilbur White, prompting him to send CIA agent-turned-private investigator Steven Chan to determine any links between Real Time and Colin’s death. Lucas contacted Nightshade, ordering them to cover his tracks by killing Chan and anyone he spoke to, including former colleagues who worked with Lucas at Real Time. Chan's death prompted the CIA to get involved and their new chief, Dwain Garfield, assigned a protective detail to Wilbur White, forcing Nightshade to eliminate him as well.

When Alex is unwittingly drawn into the case, Lucas pretends to be his ally, initially painting Real Time as the culprits and claiming that they are keeping the information secret, and getting him into the Arena to test the game and confront Klein about the game issues. However, Brother Mike kidnaps Alex and takes him to El Dorado, where the truth is revealed and Alex is forced into a duel against Nightshade's agents.

Alex wounds Lucas and holds him at gunpoint, threatening him to deactivate his malware. When Dwain Garfield orders an airstrike against El Dorado, aiming to destroy the operation regardless of human cost, Lucas refuses to face trial, and is killed in the airstrike.

Jon Lucas is a strict vegan and fitness enthusiast who prefers going barefoot whenever possible.

=== Desmond McCain ===
Desmond McCain is the main antagonist in Crocodile Tears. He is black skinned, well-built, and bald, with grey eyes. He wears an ear stud shaped like a silver crucifix.

McCain was an orphan, found abandoned in a bag of McCain's Oven Chips (where he got his name from) in Hackney, London. He was then adopted and grew up to become a boxer. He won many major boxing titles and was in line for stardom, until his boxing career came to an abrupt end when he was defeated by a boxer called Buddy Sangster in Madison Square Garden. During the bout, his jaw was smashed up badly and suffered a botched plastic surgery operation in Las Vegas when attempting to get it fixed. McCain later hired international assassin The Gentleman to kill both the surgeon and Buddy Sangster.

McCain then went into property development. He built a lot of skyscrapers in London and made a fortune, later becoming involved in politics. He joined the British Conservative Party and was elected as Minister of Sports. Problems piled up and cost him money, so he set fire to one of his properties and claimed the insurance money. McCain was exposed, however, by a homeless man who had seen it happen and sent to prison for nine years for fraud.

While McCain was in jail, he pretended to convert to Christianity for a good image. Because of this, McCain had the ability to insert biblical verses into his sentences at the most convenient of moments. He was released early and set up a charity, First Aid. He created disasters and then collected money for them, keeping half of it. He then made plans to create the ultimate disaster in Kenya. McCain joined a partnership with GM scientist Leonard Straik and created a poisonous gene to be pumped into wheat crop fields in Kenya which would spread a horrible disease that could wipe out half of Africa. When the many millions of pounds flooded in, McCain planned to steal it and hide out in Switzerland with his future wife, Myra Beckett.

Alex first crosses McCain at a New Year's Eve party he is throwing for his charity at Kilmore Castle in Scotland. Alex, McCain and Straik (unknown to Alex at this point) play Texas Hold 'Em together, with Alex eventually winning over twenty-five thousand pounds, which he promptly tells McCain to donate to the charity. When McCain learns that Alex is in the company of journalist Edward Pleasure and his daughter Sabina, he orders them killed, as Edward is investigating McCain's dealings; however, Alex, Sabina and Edward survive the assassination attempt. Alex and McCain's paths cross again, when Alex steals a sample of the wheat disease activator from Straik's office at the Greenfields Bio Centre and gives it, as well as a copy of the hard drive of Straik's computer, to MI6.

After learning who Alex is from Harry Bulman, McCain has Alex captured by Beckett and flown to his business in Kenya. McCain reveals his plan to Alex over dinner one night, and then tortures him for information and then tries to kill him by leaving him to hang over a crocodile infested river, but Alex escapes with the help of Rahim and foils McCain's plans, blowing up a dam that floods the poisoned crops. McCain follows Alex to an airport in a Kenyan village. He kills Rahim, who was piloting the plane, and Alex jumps out near some oil drums and rolls one of the barrels towards McCain. McCain stops it with his foot and just smiles. He is about to shoot Alex, but Alex has attached an exploding pen gadget to the bottom of the oil drum. It sets the drum on fire, engulfing McCain in flames. This makes McCain the first villain that Alex kills deliberately—in the case of all of Alex's other foes either someone else killed them or Alex just took action to remove an immediate threat to his life that happened to result in their deaths.

In the novel, McCain is portrayed as a vicious cynic (which contrasts heavily with the man of faith appearance he dons). He believes that the only way to earn people's respect is through wealth, disregarding the idea that respect may come from talent. The lack of respect he received as a child due to being a black orphan left him obsessed as an adult with obtaining people's respect through any means possible. He also frequently states that most people who are supposedly "kind" by helping others frequently when they are in trouble are some of the worst people alive, since they need people to be miserable so they can help them and thus feel good about themselves (he uses charitable foundations as an absolute example for this).

His manner of death is very similar to Franz Sanchez from the James Bond movie Licence to Kill.

=== Julia Rothman ===
Julia Charlotte Glenys Rothman is the main antagonist in the novel Scorpia, the only time the series would have a solitary female as the main antagonist. She is a board member of the criminal organisation Scorpia, and the head of Operation Invisible Sword. Rothman was born in Aberystwyth, Wales to Welsh nationalist parents, who would set fire to holiday homes owned by English families. One of the targeted homes was still inhabited and were killed in the fire. As a result, Rothman's parents were jailed for life. Rothman was only six years old at the time, and grew up in institutions, marking the start of her criminal lifestyle. At one time, she was married to Sandro Rothman, an elderly multimillionaire property developer, but he died two days after their wedding when he fell from his seventeen-story office building – though it is later mentioned in the Paperback edition of Snakehead that Julia pushed him to his death so she would inherit his fortune.

When John Rider, Alex's father, came to work for Scorpia, Julia fell in love with him, but after he was discovered to be a double agent, Julia plans to kill him. She assigned Ash to kill his friend to prove that he is ready to join Scorpia.

She was in charge of Operation Invisible Sword. This came from a request from a Middle Eastern billionaire to destroy Anglo-American relations, who would pay Scorpia one hundred million pounds to do so. Her plan was to insert poisoned nanoshells into the children's bloodstreams via immunisation injections, which they would receive at school. Scorpia would then make demands of America which they would never accept, such as complete nuclear disarmament, threatening to kill thousands of British children if refused. After America refuses, Scorpia will destroy the capsules, releasing the poison and killing the children. She would then make the same threats in New York, but with more reasonable demands, which they will agree to, thus destroying the alliance between Britain and America.

When Rothman meets Alex, she appears delighted to accept him into Scorpia, having him trained as an assassin by Scorpia. Because of his father's betrayal, however, she secretly plans to kill him as revenge. She arranges for the poisonous capsules used in Invisible Sword to be injected into Alex's bloodstream, without his knowledge, during a medical check-up at their Training and Assessment Centre on the island of Malagosto. During Operation Invisible Sword, the transmitter which would give out terahertz beams (destroying the capsules and killing the children) takes to the skies in a hot-air balloon. Alex climbs onto the balloon and burns the ropes holding the basket to the balloon. The flat metal board falls on Rothman, crushing her to death, destroying the satellite and ending Invisible Sword at the same time.

At the time she met Alex, Rothman was in her forties or fifties. She is described by Alex and Max Grendel as being beautiful with an upturned nose, long black hair in waves down to her shoulders, dark eyes, "blood-red lips," and "perfect teeth".

It is stated in the afterword of Point Blanc that Rothman was inspired by Catherine Zeta-Jones. Sofia Helin portrays Rothman in the series, where the character is portrayed as originating from Malta and having short blond hair. Her Invisible Sword replaces injection with inhalation, binding the poison nanoshells to chemicals which when activated turn from liquid into vapour, allowing unsuspecting victims to inhale the poison with no effects until the terahertz signal is sent (from a spire-mounted transmitter as opposed to an airborne one). Also, her death is different, where Rothman is shot dead by Mrs. Jones in the show instead of a metal board falling on top of her.

=== Dominic Royce ===
Dominic Royce is the main antagonist of Nightshade, and the instigator of their operation "Leap of Faith". He is the Permanent Under-Secretary of State for Foreign Affairs to the British government, and a very disagreeable and intimidating man, unlike his friendly predecessor.

Royce first appears at the Foreign and Commonwealth Office, in a meeting with Mrs Jones. He has discovered that she has used Alex on numerous occasions, and tells her to never use him again.

After John Crawley discovers that Nightshade are in possession of the VX nerve agent, Royce declares that MI6's incompetence requires him to put a spy of his own in their ranks, because of there being a leak in the intelligence community. Royce installs his equally disagreeable staffer, Owen Andrews, as his spy in MI6's ranks. Mrs Jones and Crawley are affronted by Andrews' presence, and with Chief Science Officer Samantha Redwing's help, they try to keep Andrews, and Royce by extension, in the dark about their operations, including asking Alex to work for them again, to rescue Frederick Grey and Mrs Jones' children, William and Sofia. Despite their best efforts, Andrews discovers Mrs Jones' actions and reports it to Royce.

While Alex is taken to Nightshade's base in Crete, Royce goes straight to Liverpool Street and orders MI6 Special Operations shut down. Jack is forcibly sent home, whilst Mrs Jones and Crawley are put under house arrest; Royce himself declares that the rest of the intelligence services, including MI5 and Special Branch, can handle the critical terror alert better than MI6. He accuses Mrs Jones of being unfit to lead the department.

It is revealed at the end of the book that Royce himself is "the Doctor", the man who is paying Nightshade to carry out Leap of Faith, and he had alerted Nightshade of Alex's presence. Mrs Jones, who is reinstated at MI6's reopening, deduced this from Royce's initials, and through his computer and bank account movements. When questioned, Royce reveals he asked Nightshade to assassinate the Cabinet, the Opposition and many other MPs in one place, out in the open, due to his dissatisfaction with them; he does, however, express regret over the potential deaths of innocents, such as choristers, priests and TV crewers. He says that although the average of an MP is fifty years, they act like petulant children, as though their careers are more important than the issues they were elected to attend to. He believes that the younger generation, given the opportunity, will lead the world to real change; therefore, he arranged for the death of popular former politician James, Lord Clifford, and for Nightshade to detonate the VX at Lord Clifford's memorial at St Paul's Cathedral, as it is impossible to attack the Palace of Westminster. Mrs Jones then arranges for Royce to take a "long holiday" at the Gibraltar holding facility, faking his death in the process which fooled even Nightshade.

=== General Alexei Sarov ===
General Alexei Igorevich Sarov is the main antagonist of Skeleton Key. He is a former Russian general who still longs for the old days of communist Russia, of the Soviet Union, and of Stalin.

Sarov was born in 1940, and enlisted in the Soviet Army at the age of sixteen. His first major deployment was to the Hungarian Revolution, where his unit was ambushed in Budapest, and half of it, including Sarov's superiors, were killed, leading him to take command and achieve a victory. He served as a commander in the army from then on, having received a field promotion from private to sergeant for his victory in Hungary, and quickly rose through the ranks. Sarov married when he was 31, and was made a general when he was 38. For ten years he fought in Afghanistan, first as a military adviser and then in personally overthrowing the president, and rose to become second-in-command of the Red Army. He was awarded the Order of Lenin for his efforts.

Sarov wanted his son Vladimir to join the Russian army, but his wife disagreed, which led to their divorce. Eventually, Vladimir, who was a talented athlete, did join the army in 1988 when he was sixteen. He became a powerful and skilled soldier, but was shot and killed by a sniper in Afghanistan, and his funeral was not attended by his father, who refused to abandon his men for any reason at all. When Sarov meets Alex, he sees a lot of his son in him and makes plans to adopt him.

With the collapse of the Soviet Union and the rise of capitalism, Sarov felt betrayed and disgusted, at the way his country was heading. He promptly quit the army and moved to communist Cuba, which welcomed him outright.

Sarov's residence is the Case de Oro ("House of Gold") on the island of Cayo Esqueleto ("Skeleton Key") in Cuba. There are two entrances to his home, one of them being a booby trapped underwater cave called "The Devil's Chimney". The cave has a security device in which anything that enters the cave is impaled by mechanical stalagmites and stalactites, which are responsible for the deaths of CIA agents Tom Turner (Glen Carver in American editions) and Belinda Troy.

Sarov plans to restore communism in Russia by detonating a nuclear bomb in Murmansk, where abandoned nuclear submarines are kept. The nuclear explosion would kill millions. Russia will be blamed and will turn to their president. Sarov will then release edited footage "exposing" the president as a lazy drunken idiot who says he can't deal with the issue. Russia will go back to communism, and Sarov will be taking over, eventually conquering the world.

Sarov invites the Russian president (and childhood friend), Boris Kiriyenko, to his home on Skeleton Key. Sarov edits several tapes humiliating Kiriyenko, which he will release after he has executed his plan, turning the country against Kiriyenko and allowing Sarov to seize power. During a banquet, he drugs the president's vodka, and that of his retinue, leaving them unconscious. Sarov then steals the president's plane, which will not be searched when they stop to refuel, and thus the bomb will not be discovered. When they land to refuel in Edinburgh, Sarov doesn't permit Alex to leave the plane. Naturally, Alex refuses and attempts to escape, using a stun grenade disguise as a keyring. He finds a telephone in a security section of Edinburgh Airport but a self-confident security guard, George Prescott, notices Alex and won't allow him to warn MI6. Sarov then finds Alex, leads him back to the plane, and leaves his personal assassin, Conrad, to shoot the annoying Prescott. Sarov and Conrad handcuff Alex to his seat and fly over to Murmansk in northwestern Russia to start Sarov's plan of world domination.

At Murmansk, Sarov reunites with men who share his ideals and fought under him in Afghanistan, drives with the bomb to the shipyard, and leaves Alex to die in the explosion, as Alex had refused to be adopted by him. Alex, however, is able to remove the detonation card from the nuclear bomb, when the shipyard is stormed by the Russian Navy (it turns out Prescott's radio was still on when Conrad killed him, and his conversation with Alex was discovered and passed to MI6), who promptly engage in a firefight with Sarov's men. Sarov then arrives and calmly tells Alex to put it back, before threatening to detonate the bomb via an override that will kill everyone in the shipyard, but still allow communism to rule the planet. Alex refuses, throws the card into the sea and states he would rather die than have a father like Sarov. A devastated Sarov pulls out a pistol and shoots himself right in front of Alex, unable to live with himself any more, and also to avoid being captured.

When he met Alex, Sarov was sixty-two years old, but looked "twenty years younger". Sarov is described as not being particularly tall, but he "radiates power and control". He also has short grey hair, pale blue eyes, and an emotionless face. He normally dresses in either suits or his old Red Army uniform.

Several parallels can be drawn between General Sarov and General Zaroff from The Most Dangerous Game, a short story by Richard Connell. Besides the name of the characters, their backgrounds are also very similar. Both are Russian, and while General Sarov is considered a hero in his country, General Zaroff was a Cossack aristocrat and much admired. Both miss a previous Russian era (Zaroff longing for the pre-revolution Russia, while Sarov misses communist Russia). Moreover, both are formal and polite men, usually without any emotion on their face, and yet are both capable of incredible cruelty, violence, and possible madness. Also, their main servers (Conrad in Sarov's case and Ivan in Zaroff's case) are ugly, violent beings that their masters don't really care for.

=== Herod Sayle ===
Herod Sayle (named Darrius Sayle in the film adaption of Stormbreaker) is the main antagonist in Stormbreaker. In the original UK edition, Sayle was born in the gutters of Beirut, Lebanon; the US edition changed his nationality to Egyptian. He was one of 13 children (nine boys and four girls). His father was a failed hairdresser (oral hygienist in the US version) and his mother took in washing. At age seven, he saved two rich American tourists from being crushed by a falling piano, who rewarded him by sending him to school in Britain. He was at first delighted at this prospect, but he was severely bullied because he was seen as a foreigner, with the worst bully being the future Prime Minister. Although he did very well in school, achieving nine 'O' levels, he came to hate British schoolchildren, claiming it took "only days" for him to hate "that flag".

After his schooling, he went to King's College, Cambridge, where he received a first in economics, and built up a large and successful business empire, becoming a multi-millionaire. He owned, among other things, a computer company, a radio station and a string of unsuccessful racehorses. Even after these contributions, he remained an outsider and was denied citizenship. Sayle also invented a technique that allows computer components to be developed in a non-sterile environment, greatly reducing the price of production. Using this technique, he developed a computer called "Stormbreaker" and planned to donate a Stormbreaker to each school in Britain, in exchange for a British citizenship. However, he plans to fill each Stormbreaker with a lethal smallpox virus (it is later revealed, in the novel Snakehead, that he purchased the smallpox from Scorpia), which will be released into the schools, killing virtually every child (and probably the teachers too) in Britain. MI6 is suspicious about his intentions, and send out agent Ian Rider to investigate. Rider sends out an urgent message to MI6, but is assassinated by Yassen Gregorovich.

MI6 blackmails Ian Rider's nephew, Alex Rider, into investigating Sayle. Alex investigates the plant and its operations and soon discovers Sayle's plan. Alex later reaches the Stormbreaker opening ceremony, and stops the Prime Minister from activating the Stormbreakers, at the same time injuring Sayle in the left arm and shoulder; however, Sayle escapes.

At the end of the book, after debriefing with Mrs. Jones and Alan Blunt, Alex takes a taxi home, only to discover that the driver is Sayle. Sayle takes Alex at gunpoint to the top of a building. He is about to shoot Alex but Yassen Gregorovich climbs out of a helicopter and shoots Sayle, killing him, as Sayle had become "an embarrassment" to SCORPIA. Surprisingly, Gregorovich lets Alex live (he claims there were no instructions for him in regard to Alex) and flies the helicopter away.

Sayle's dislike of the UK, and especially the British schoolchildren and Prime Minister, is a strong contrast to Winston Yu, the antagonist of Snakehead, who is obsessed with Britain and liked being brought up in a British public school (in his case, Harrow). He was only ever bullied on one occasion (the bully was then assassinated by his mother).

In the film adaptation of Stormbreaker, Sayle was portrayed by Mickey Rourke: this version of the character was changed to an American named Darrius Sayle, who grew up in a trailer park somewhere in California and was sent to be educated in Britain because his mother won a million dollars in the state lottery, but the rest of the character's backstory remains unchanged.

In a First News interview, Anthony Horowitz revealed that Sayle's name is derived from the Christmas Harrods sale. While not specifically stated by Horowitz, Herod may also be an allusion to the Massacre of the Innocents for the nature of his master plan.

His objective of killing British schoolchildren with a virus is very similar to Rothman's.

He is described in the novel as being short, bald, stocky, and grey-eyed, while the portrayal in the film version is tall, well-built, tanned, and has long hair.

=== SCORPIA ===
SCORPIA (acronym for Sabotage, Corruption, Intelligence and Assassination) is a criminal organisation, and the series' main antagonist. Despite not appearing until the fifth novel Scorpia, their influence was felt in the very first novel, Stormbreaker, as it was revealed when they appeared in Snakehead that they were responsible for supplying the virus Sayle uses, and Yassen Gregorovich's employer. Scorpia has had a great deal of influence on the Alex Rider series, and are mentioned at least three times. They were formed in Paris in the early 1980s by spies and assassins from several governments who, fearing they would lose their jobs when the Cold War ended, decided to go into business for themselves. They split profits equally and are assigned tasks alphabetically, with chairmen chosen as new projects arise. After many years of work, they are now responsible for a tenth of the world's terrorism. Scorpia caused the assassinations of Alex's mother, father, and uncle. In addition, they attempted to kill Alex by using a sniper, however the sniper missed his heart by an inch as Alex was going down a step at the moment the sniper took the shot (Alex lived because his artery shut itself down after he was shot).

Known board members include the acting chairman Zeljan Kurst, Major Winston Yu (deceased), Julia Rothman (killed), Max Grendel (murdered), Levi Kroll (murdered), a Frenchman called Jean Picoq, a Chinese man called Dr. Three who is the world's foremost expert on pain and torture, having written books about it, a Japanese man named Hideo Mikato (it is said in Scorpia that he has a diamond set in his teeth and in Snakehead that he has yakuza tattoos all over his body), and an Australian man named Brendan Chase, who abandoned his job as paymaster of the ASIS when he stole four hundred thousand dollars from them in a drunken haze (he was previously known as #5, as he never used his real name). Three other board members were mentioned to have died before the audience is introduced to the organisation; two of them were murdered and the third died of cancer. Two board members were killed over the course of the fifth novel. The first, Max Grendel, a former German spy and the oldest member at the time at seventy-three, decides to have no part in the operation Invisible Sword and attempts to retire, but is immediately killed by a suitcase of scorpions given to him by Julia Rothman. Rothman herself is then killed when Invisible Sword is foiled by Alex Rider and she is crushed to death by her terahertz transmitter. Major Winston Yu dies in the book Snakehead, having made the same mistake as Rothman by underestimating Rider, thus leaving the current roster at exactly half of what it was at its inception.

In Scorpia Rising, six new members are taken on to bring the roster back up to its original twelve. They include an Irish man from the IRA calling himself Seamus, twins Giovanni and Eduardo Grimaldi from the Italian Mafia, Monsieur Duval, and Razim. A veteran board member, former Israeli agent Levi Kroll, is killed as part of Razim's plan to bring Alex Rider to Cairo. At the end of Scorpia Rising it is revealed that Scorpia has disbanded following Razim's failure and death: after failing to defeat a teenager three times, they became a laughing stock. Several executive board members, Kurst included, were arrested.

SCORPIA is sometimes compared to the James Bond organisation SPECTRE.

Executive Board

- Zeljan Kurst (chairman; incarcerated)
- Major Winston Yu (deceased, broke every single bone in his body spontaneously after his yacht was hit by a tidal wave)
- Julia Rothman (deceased, flattened by her own terahertz transmitting equipment)
- Max Grendel (chairman; murdered by Julia Rothman, heart failure while being stung by scorpions)
- Levi Kroll (murdered on the orders of Zeljan Kurst, shot through the back of his neck and his body thrown into the Thames)
- Dr. Three (fate unknown)
- Brendan Chase (fate unknown)
- Hideo Mikato (fate unknown)
- Jean Picoq (fate unknown)

In Scorpia Rising, six new members were added to the Scorpia board, including:

- Seamus (incarcerated)
- Monsieur Duval (incarcerated)
- Razim (Abdul-Aziz Al-Rahim) (deceased, suffocated in his own salt mine)
- The Grimaldi brothers Eduardo and Giovanni (escaped; both deceased when their train exploded in Never Say Die)

=== da Silva ===
da Silva is the main antagonist of the short story Christmas at Gunpoint. Very little is known about him.

Alex first sees him while staying at the ski resort of Gunpoint, Colorado with his uncle, Ian Rider, during the Christmas before Stormbreaker. He noticed that Ian was focused on da Silva as he checked in to the resort, not noticing Alex walk up to him. Later that night, Alex sees them struggling with a gun, causing him to get involved in the fight. He is able to take the gun and use it to cause all the snow on the roof of the resort to fall on and bury da Silva (with Ian commenting "let's leave him to chill out").

The next day, Alex discovers that da Silva, along with two other men, had kidnapped a friend Alex had made at the resort, Sahara Sands. They intended to use her as blackmail for her father, Cameron Sands, to hand over his laptop computer with unknown government secrets. Alex follows Sands up several ski lifts until they reach the high point of the resort where da Silva and his men were waiting with Sahara. During the exchange, Alex steals the laptop and skis down the course followed by da Silva and his men, ending with Alex crashing and sliding to the middle of a frozen creek. da Silva orders Alex to give him the laptop, though Alex refuses, noting that he is too heavy to step on the ice. da Silva is about to shoot Alex when Ian arrives and shoots da Silva in the shoulder, then orders the men to throw their skis in the creek, forcing them to walk down the mountain. da Silva and the men are presumably arrested when they eventually reach the bottom.

A couple of years later, Alex meets Sahara Sands again, where she reveals her father was working in the office of the American Secretary of Defense, and that his laptop hard drive contained classified information on the withdrawal of troops from Iraq. da Silva had presumably been hired to steal the laptop and leak the data, which would have resulted in a huge embarrassment for the US government.

da Silva is described as being thirty years old, with blond hair that looks painted on, a lazy smile, a Bronx accent, pale skin, bulging muscles, and bad teeth.

=== Colonel Aubrey Sykes ===
Colonel Aubrey Sykes, DSO is the main antagonist of the short story The Man With Eleven Fingers. He is an embittered former colonel in the British Army, and a veteran of the Iraq campaign. He was badly wounded during Operation Telic, where he saved eleven of his men during an ambush in Mosul. Despite his bravery and receiving of the Distinguished Service Order medal, he feels as though he has received nothing for his service, and wants revenge, arguing that the army gave him nothing and the government forgot about him.

Sykes gathered together a collection of Iraq veterans in similar situations to his own, feeling forgotten about by Britain in general, and planned an act of revenge that he called 'Operation London Down', allowing them all to get what they felt they deserved. He and his co-conspirators would distribute chocolate bars across London, supposedly from Cadbury, but laced with a hallucinogenic cultivated by Peruvian toads. While not lethal, the hallucinogen would make whoever had consumed the tainted chocolate feel as though they were having a heart attack. With so many chocolate bars distributed and consumed across the city, London would be effectively paralysed, leaving Sykes and his associates free to capture the disgraced City Capital bank chairman Sir Frederick 'Freddy Fingers' Meadows from his theft trial at the Old Bailey and force him, through torture if need be, to surrender the one hundred and twenty million pounds that he had stolen from City Capital, which Sir Frederick was going to give to charity.

When Alex goes for a routine dental appointment, he is offered a tainted chocolate bar by one of Sykes' underlings, and, unaware of the nature of the treat, plans to have it later in the day. However, he stows away in a van, after noticing that it is driven by Charlie (a previously unnamed henchman from Stormbreaker who has joined Sykes' operation), the injuries of some of the chocolate vendors, and an elementary spelling mistake on the chocolate wrapper (saying 'Cadbury's', when it should read 'Cadbury'). Arriving at Sykes' lair in Smithfields, Alex discovers the plan to paralyse London. He knocks out Sarko (another veteran working for Sykes), takes his disguise and infiltrates Sykes and his underlings Charlie, Danny, Gareth and Khyber (disguised as paramedics from the London Ambulance Service) as they drive through the city and abduct Sir Frederick from his trial.

However, when on a yacht (the Phantom Lady) taking them away from London, Alex's cover is blown by Sykes (ripping his disguise off) and Charlie (recognising him from Stormbreaker). When Sykes learns that Alex is a spy from Charlie, he intends to shoot him dead, calling him a "child soldier", but the men suddenly keel over; it is revealed that before abducting Sir Frederick, the men drank coffee at the lair, which was made by Alex and is laced with the hallucinogen. Despite drinking the coffee himself, Sykes is unaffected by the hallucinogen (possibly due to a higher metabolism) and comes close to strangling Alex, when Sir Frederick, disgusted by the scene and fearing for his own life, shoots him. However, it is deliberately left ambiguous if Sykes is dead, with Alex thinking he "might" be dead.

=== Major Winston Yu ===
Major Winston Yu is one of the members of the executive board of Scorpia, and the main antagonist of the novel Snakehead. He was asked by Zeljan Kurst, another board member of Scorpia, to command operation "Reef Encounter". This involved generating an artificial tsunami to destroy Reef Island and the west coast of Australia by detonating a stolen bomb named "Royal Blue" between two underwater tectonic plates when they are most vulnerable. He was the superior of Anan Sukit, but apparently inherits control of the Bangkok Snakehead when Ben "Fox" Daniels kills Sukit. Yu suffers from brittle bone disease, which makes his skeleton highly unstable. His mother named him after Winston Churchill.

Yu was born in Hong Kong, the offspring of an illicit sexual liaison between a businessman from Royal Tunbridge Wells and a chamber maid; his father absconded when he was born. Winston spent part of his early life in poverty as his mother smuggled soap and shampoo home, as they were the only luxury items Winston had at the time. Having been told of the beauty and power of the United Kingdom, Yu's mother became an assassin, working for a snakehead: she undertook this work to have Winston sent to be educated in Britain, and Winston was grateful to his mother for her work. Winston was educated at Harrow, before studying at London University and joining the British Army as an officer at Sandhurst. Shortly after Winston passed out, his mother died, apparently of a heart attack; he was shattered, and bribed a gardener at Buckingham Palace to have her ashes scattered in the rose garden.

Yu fought in Northern Ireland during the Troubles, serving four tours of duty and rising to the rank of major; however, he was soon diagnosed with brittle bone disease and forced to leave the Army. He then took up a desk job at MI6, but he was not satisfied with this job, and secretly sold information to Britain's enemies. When Scorpia was founded in Paris, Yu was one of the twelve founders.

When given responsibility for Reef Encounter, Yu has half a dozen of his underlings steal the Royal Blue bomb from a secret Ministry of Defence laboratory, and ship it to Australia. He later enters his handprint into the bomb's control system, allowing him to be the one who will detonate it.

After capturing Alex, Yu reveals that he will be sent to an illegal organ harvesting clinic in Kakadu, to pay for both his thwarting of Invisible Sword and his damage to Reef Encounter. However, Alex escapes, reunites with the Australian SAS, and storms Yu's Dragon Nine rig, where the bomb is due to be detonated. Although Yu falls down a maintenance tunnel, he survives, despite breaking his ankles, and escapes on his yacht. However, Alex (who had previously scanned his handprint into the control system) detonates the bomb prematurely, which causes a wave that hits Yu's yacht, and he dies when the wave hits, as every bone in his body shatters because of his illness.

Physically speaking, Yu is a Chinese man, of average height, with a full head of hair which, unusually for a Chinese person, is completely white. He dresses in expensive suits, all in white, wears large round glasses, and wears expensive grey gloves to protect his hands. His English is perfect, and his accent is comparable to an old-fashioned newscaster. He is also extremely Anglophilic, having a croquet lawn set up at one of his homes, British-made art and furniture in his rooms, and a habit of taking afternoon tea at the Ritz.

=== Nightshade ===
Nightshade are a new criminal organization, introduced properly in Nightshade. They were first mentioned at the end of Never Say Die when Mrs Jones pores over a file marked "Nightshade", concerning a missing child who eventually resurfaced as a teenage assassin.

Nightshade is a freelance terror unit posing as a cult, specialising in capturing the children of families connected to the military, intelligence and other areas, and indoctrinating them to be the perfect child soldier, utterly obedient to the will of the "Teachers", four Americans who are the executive committee of Nightshade:

- "Brother" Lamar Jensen: The founder and chief executive. He is the former chairman of LJ Weapons Systems, one of the world's biggest weapons providers, in Hampton, Virginia, dealing with the American government, the Saudi Arabian government, and the Indian government. He was found to have been conducting private arms sales to Islamic State, the Taliban, Boko Haram and others, until he was discovered and imprisoned, until he broke out of gaol fifteen years previously. He is described as being "completely bald, with a round head that seemed to be melting", and neck and cheeks that "hung down in loose folds, and his lips were so thick that they bulged out beneath his nose". He has a penchant for cigars, and, as one of the Teachers, is seen teaching physics, discussing IEDs.
- "Sister" Professor Krysten Shultz: A former director at Harvard School of Engineering, until she disappeared twelve years previously, and responsible for developing the radio implants in the Numbers' necks. She has pale skin, "long white hair that swept down over her shoulders" (cut short in Nightshade Revenge) and a "thin, angular face with a nose like a kitchen knife", with glasses, dangling silver earrings, and long fingers that "made her look vaguely witchlike". At Harvard, she was leading microscopic radio receivers using diamonds, so she was responsible for creating the radio implants inside the Numbers. She has responsibility for academic training of the Numbers.
- "Sister" Jeanne: Apparently the oldest of the committee, she is well-built, resembling an "aging supermodel" with "the look of a matron at a private clinic"; with chestnut hair which always looks fake, and wears too much makeup to disguise her age. She has medical responsibility for the Numbers.
- Lenny "Brother Mike" Michelangelo: The sole African-American member of the committee. Described as having been "a heavy hitter with the Mob", he is an extremely unfriendly man, with close-shaven hair, eyes that are always suspicious and a very precise way of speaking. He wears round glasses and has a face "that, from the look of it, had never learned to smile". He has responsibility for physical training of the Numbers, and appears to have an obsession with killing Numbers who are "compromised".

The Numbers are the children in Nightshade's thrall, practically raised for warfare all their lives, to do everything the Teachers say without question; the Teachers explain their decisions as being for the good of the world. Each Number is fitted with a subdermal implant consisting of a bone conduction microphone and radio loop aerial, allowing the Teachers to communicate with them no matter where in the world they are; this has a side effect of creating a "divine voice" that keeps the Numbers in thrall. They are trained heavily, with martial arts, foreign languages, battlefield medicine and skills that are specific to missions, such as parachuting, or piloting model aircraft. Numbers are not even given names, as their designation implies; they are simply given a numeric designation, in order to remove their individuality.

There are twenty-three out of twenty-five Numbers at the beginning of the novel Nightshade: Numbers Fourteen and Twenty-One are said to have died in training accidents. Known Numbers include:

- Frederick "Freddy" Grey (Number Nine): The long-lost son of Lieutenant General Sir William Grey, a Royal Engineers veteran of the Iraq War. After being captured, he was sent to the Gibraltar prison after his capture until "Julius" helped him escape. He is named after the British Minister of Defence in the James Bond film Moonraker.
- Sofia Jones (Number Six): The long-lost daughter of Mrs. Jones, who was partnered with Freddy Grey on the assassination that eventually led to Nightshade's exposure. She and Freddy appear to be romantically interested in each other.
- William Jones (Number Seven): The long-lost son of Mrs. Jones. He was suspicious of "Julius" since his arrival, but presumably initially accepted him after he was saved by "Julius".
- "Julius Grief" ("Number Twenty-Six"): in fact Alex Rider in disguise.

In Nightshade Revenge, Nightshade have allied with Jon Lucas to help him sabotage his former employers of Real Time. To that end, they operate out of Lucas' replica Wild West town of Eldorado, with the Numbers dressing as ranch hands to blend in. Nightshade threaten Alex to break Freddy out of prison and return him to them; however, Freddy has been discreetly supplying Alex with clues to help him find them. Freddy's betrayal is later discovered by Brother Lamar and he is imprisoned in Lucas' ranch; Brother Mike attempts to re-educate Freddy, but later - at Lucas' prodding - sets up a Wild West duel as a test to either recondition Freddy or dispose of both him and Alex at the same time. However, after Alex is captured, he and Freddy convince the other Numbers to rebel against the Teachers; in the morning, as Alex and Freddy are made to duel each other, Freddy shoots and kills Brother Mike, while William Jones/Number Seven shoots and kills the rest of the Teachers, and the Numbers turn on the guards, ending Nightshade. Alex is able to get the rest of the Numbers to safety, but Freddy is fatally wounded during their escape: as he dies in Alex's arms, Freddy expresses worry and regret over what Nightshade did to him and made him do, gratitude for having Alex as his first real friend in spite of it all, and hope that the other Numbers will also get a chance to recover from Nightshade's conditioning. The final mention of the Numbers is when Mrs Jones informs Alex that American intelligence is attempting to deprogram and rehabilitate them before they attempt to reunite them with their families; nevertheless, she is able to get her own children back, and is comforted that they are willing to recognise her as their mother.

== Secondary antagonists ==
This is a list of the series' secondary antagonists, in alphabetical order.

=== Amanda ===
Amanda is a formerly Israeli Army soldier and a SCORPIA trainee who befriends Alex in SCORPIA, although it is speculated that she might be spying on him at the orders of their leaders.

=== Owen Andrews ===
Owen Andrews is a minor antagonist in Nightshade, the assistant of Dominic Royce. He is placed undercover in MI6 by Royce because of a leak in the intelligence community. He exposes Mrs. Jones' use of Alex to Royce, who disbands them and places Jones and John Crawley under house arrest, and gives Andrews a week's vacation in Costa Rica, with Crawley warning Andrews that he will make sure he regrets his betrayal for the rest of his life. Later when MI6 is reformed, it is revealed that a drunken Andrews was arrested after being found on a beach in a Batman costume with a five hundred gram bag of cocaine concealed in the cape (all of which was set up by Crawley). He is last mentioned to be facing up to ten years in prison.

=== Dr. Walter Baxter ===
Dr. Walter Baxter is a secondary antagonist in Point Blanc, who serves as a staple part of Dr. Hugo Grief's plan for world domination. Baxter is a gifted plastic surgeon who suffered from a gambling addiction, which led to him altering the features of a Serbian war criminal, leading to him being struck off from Harley Street. Dr. Grief found Baxter and brought him into his inner circle. Baxter's job involved physically altering Grief's clones to resemble the students at Point Blanc, which he was paid two million pounds for. Alex watches as Baxter and Grief discuss the status of the final clone and Baxter's payment, during which he asks for another million to keep silent, causing Grief to shoot him in the head (also because of Baxter's unreliability) and have his body buried in the mountains.

He is portrayed by Simon Paisley Day in the series.

=== Mike Beckett ===
Mike Beckett is a minor independent villain in Point Blanc. He is the former cellmate and fellow drug dealer of Skoda. Beckett proposed the idea of having him and Skoda living together and running their drug dealing ring from an iron barge in Putney River, despite the fact that the barge has "no toilet, no proper kitchen and was freezing in winter", and despite the fact that the barge is located a short distance from the local police station, but "the pigs would never think of looking on their doorstep", so he and Skoda laugh at the police going past, in their cars and boats.

Beckett is described as being "blonde-haired and ugly, with twisted lips".

=== Dr. Myra Bennett ===
Dr. Myra Bennett (named Myra Beckett in the US version) is an antagonist in the novel Crocodile Tears. She first appears as the supervisor at Greenfields. She is portrayed as a scientist with very little emotion. She does not care about her appearance, as evidenced by her cheap spectacles and her lack of makeup. She is the fiancée of Desmond McCain, although she never displays any particular emotion in her dealings with him beyond her usual relatively blank appearance (though she once referred to him as "Dezzy"). She is very sadistic, as she takes photos of Alex while he is being tortured. She is killed when she is stabbed from behind by Rahim and falls into a crocodile-infested river, where she is eaten alive, after which her only remains is an ankle in a shoe.

=== Harry Bulman ===
Harold Edward "Harry" Bulman is a minor villain in Crocodile Tears.

A freelance journalist who served in the Royal Marine Commandos before being dishonourably discharged for cowardice under fire, Bulman spent most of his time writing stories focusing on the secret services, and had discovered information about Alex's actions during his missions against Herod Sayle, Damian Cray and Winston Yu. He arranges for Alex to be attacked by three Chinese men, supposedly working for the late Major Yu, and photographs Alex fighting the men off. He then approaches Alex and Jack at home, before planning to publish a book on Alex's MI6 life, the profits of which he says he will share with Alex (although he had no real intention of doing so).

Alex, fearing exposure, reluctantly approaches MI6, asking them to discourage Bulman from his work. John Crawley leads Operation Invisible Man, which sees Bulman having his bank accounts drained and credit cards stolen, his car disappearing and locking him out of his own apartment in Chalk Farm, as well as broadcasting the news that Bulman is dead, that he is "his" own killer, escaped Broadmoor inmate Jeremy Harwood. After Bulman is arrested, Crawley meets him and makes it clear that he will vanish off the face of the earth if he ever approaches Alex again or publishes the story.

Unable to get profit out of his story, Bulman is approached by a friend, who hears that somebody (later revealed to be Desmond McCain) is asking for information about Alex, for a lot of money. Wanting to take revenge on Alex, Bulman contacts McCain and tells him all he knows. Bulman sees an opportunity for a story about McCain wanting to know about Alex, and tries to ask for more money; McCain, having anticipated this, and fearing Bulman would write about him anyway, shoots Bulman dead three times, and has his body buried under the construction site for a homeless shelter that his First Aid charity is building.

Bulman is referenced again in Scorpia Rising, where Razim is mentioned as having obtained Bulman's notes.

=== Carlo ===
Carlo is a minion of the Salesman who is sent to deliver uranium to General Sarov in Skeleton Key. He is thirty years old with black hair and stubble.

=== Ravi Chandra ===
Ravindra Manpreet "Ravi" Chandra is a minor character in Crocodile Tears.

Chandra works at the Jowada nuclear power station near Chennai, India. He has a wife and two boys, aged four and six, whom he wishes to provide for. Desmond McCain offers him a handsome sum of money to infiltrate Jowada's security, plant a bomb, and let loose a radioactive cloud on the city of Chennai. McCain betrays Chandra, however, by lying and telling him that there was a 10-minute delay on the bomb's timer. As there was, in reality, no delay, Chandra is killed in the initial explosion, and McCain's charity (later to be found out as fake) raises thousands of pounds for the victims affected by the disaster. However, Chandra's link with McCain is identified by RAW, the Indian foreign intelligence agency, who dispatch an agent, Rahim, to investigate and eliminate him.

=== The Big Circle ===
The Big Circle (collectively) is a secondary independent antagonist in Skeleton Key. They are a Chinese Triad gang involved in drugs, vice, illegal immigration, and gambling. Alex first encounters them at the Wimbledon tennis tournament when they attempt systematic match fixing to earn money in bets. After Alex foils this plan, he becomes a major target of the Triad, who send a high-ranking member after him in Cornwall. After this member fails too, Alex is sent undercover with CIA agents Tom Turner (Glen Carver in U.S. publications) and Belinda Troy for his safety. At the end of the book, Mrs. Jones reveals she bargained with the Triad in a prisoner exchange to leave Alex alone.

=== Conrad ===
Conrad is General Alexei Sarov's personal assistant and thus one of the main antagonists of the novel Skeleton Key. He is a Turk that was born in Istanbul, and was a terrorist-for-hire with nine different security services after him. His exact identity is in doubt, but according to the Mission Files, he is possibly Naim Okur, the son of a butcher who had destroyed his school with a home-made bomb as revenge for being put in detention. He is held responsible for terrorist actions in London, Boston, Madrid, and Athens. He is described as a short man with several scars and dead skin all around his body. Half of his head is bald, one of his legs is longer than the other, one of his arms is shorter than the other, one side of his mouth is sagging, and one of his eyes is permanently bloodshot. The reason for his appearance is that in the winter of 1998 a bomb that he was carrying to a military base had exploded early, and to save his life, a group of Albanian scientists from Elbasan had given him metal pins and prosthetics to hold his body together.

He first appears in the novel after placing a bomb in The Salesman's ship, where he is seen by Alex Rider, although Alex doesn't know who he is at the time. Later, after Tom Turner (named Glen Carver in the US version of Skeleton Key) and Belinda Troy are killed in an underwater cave, Conrad kidnaps Alex and puts him in a crusher, only for Alex to be saved by General Sarov, who plans on adopting Alex.

After Alex is saved by Sarov and kept in his home, Conrad expresses tremendous hostility towards him, wishing to shoot him. Throughout Alex's stay, Conrad often says to him that when Sarov disposes of him, he will shoot him or make his death very painful.

Conrad is killed when a magnetic crane, which he used to position Sarov's nuclear bomb, magnetises all the metal pins and prosthetics in his body and attaches him to the magnet, breaking his neck and back and killing him (with Alex commenting, "What an attractive man."). Alex then drops his body in the ocean and he is never seen again.

=== Force Three ===
Force Three are a small eco-terrorist organisation created by Nikolei Drevin to act as a scapegoat for his plan to destroy Washington, D.C. (see Nikolei Drevin). Their name refers to Earth being the third planet from the sun. Their members consist of the leader, Kaspar, and four other men, who, as their real names are never used, Alex names "Combat Jacket", "Spectacles", "Steel Watch", and "Silver Tooth" after their distinguishing features.

They are first encountered by Alex when they attempt to kidnap Nikolei Drevin's son Paul from hospital, to convince the world of the danger of Force Three. Alex incapacitates four using a Defibrillator, Oxygen cylinder, Medicine ball, and MRI machine. However Kaspar, acting as driver, knocks Alex out and kidnaps him, believing Alex to be Paul. Alex manages to convince the group that he is not Paul, but they decide to abandon him in a property development owned by Drevin. They intend to allow Alex to escape, but "Combat Jacket" disobeys his orders and attempts to kill Alex in revenge for his humiliation at the hospital, although Alex cheats death again. The group then appear at Stamford Bridge, where Alex first follows "Silver Tooth" to the changing room of Drevin's Football team, where he meets "Combat Jacket", "Spectacles" and Adam Wright, the star player of Drevin's football team, who is then murdered by them with a caesium medallion. Alex is also taken hostage by "Steel Watch", but tempts a drunken supporter of Drevin's team to intervene, allowing Alex to escape. Force Three resurfaces on Drevin's island when Alex is interviewed by Drevin about his role as a spy, and "Combat Jacket" denies trying to kill Alex at the property development. Drevin promptly has the four men shot by his head of security, Magnus Payne, who is revealed to be Kaspar. He is left alive, as he still has a role to play in Drevin's plan. Kaspar later dies in space, presumably bleeding to death after having a knife driven into his face.

=== Franco ===
Franco is a brutal enforcer serving under Yassen in Eagle Strike who is knocked unconscious by Alex when he infiltrates Yassen's yacht and badly injured by Alex when he escapes after being captured.

=== Dwain Garfield ===
Dwain Garfield is the head of the CIA in Nightshade Revenge. Legless, ruthless, paranoid, despotic, and determined to "Make American security Great Again", Garfield is a veteran of the war in Afghanistan who famously treated his own amputated legs without medical attention and refuses to cooperate with any other agency or even take orders from the White House. Garfield threatens Alex to leave the Nightshade investigation to him alone, setting his agents to torture Alex, dismissing any input Alex provides, and eventually calling in an air strike to destroy the El Dorado ranch where Nightshade is operating out of, callously dismissing the consequence of Alex being killed as not worth his time because "he isn't even American". At the end of Nightshade Revenge, it is revealed that Garfield was discovered drunk in a motel in Washington with half a million dollars of stolen CIA money concealed in his wheelchair and has been arrested; it is implied that John Crawley was involved as retribution for the airstrike and Garfield's attitude towards Alex.

=== The Gentleman ===
The Gentleman is an unnamed assassin featured briefly in Point Blanc. He obtained the name 'Gentleman' because he always sends flowers to the families of his victims (as mentioned, he sends black tulips in Point Blanc). He is an assassin for hire in his early thirties, but other than this no backstory or facts about him are provided. He is hired by Dr Hugo Grief to assassinate Michael Roscoe in New York when he becomes suspicious of his son Paul's unusual behaviour (Paul had, in fact, been replaced by a surgically altered teenage clone of Grief). The Gentleman posed as an engineer by the name of Sam Green (murdering the real Sam Green in order to do so), and made a hologram of a fake elevator floor. Similar operations happened in Russia, when Foreign Intelligence Service head General Victor Ivanov died when his motorboat exploded on the Black Sea, and again (according to the Alex Rider Mission Dossier) in Brisbane, where newspaper magnate Robert Merrick died after choking on a chicken bone in a restaurant, despite the fact that he had been a vegetarian for six years; Merrick, Roscoe and Ivanov had all grown suspicious of their sons, who had also been attending Point Blanc Academy.

The Gentleman is also mentioned in Crocodile Tears, as Desmond McCain explains that he hired an assassin to murder a plastic surgeon who did a botched job on McCain's jaw after his boxing accident. He also killed the boxer who ruined McCain's boxing career, Buddy Sangster, by pushing him under a train in New York. It is believed the Gentleman did the work, as Edward Pleasure comments that a fan of Sangster's sent in a hundred black tulips, his calling card.

The Gentleman is one of the two antagonists that have not heard of or met Alex Rider, the other being Ravi Chandra of Crocodile Tears.

It is possible that The Gentleman has either heard of or encountered or used to be 'The Priest', a contract killer MI6 has encountered in the past.

In Scorpia Rising, there is an unnamed assassin in the prison that also contained Julius Grief. This was rumoured to be the Gentleman, although in Nightshade he was revealed to be a Caribbean hitman known as Mr Someone.

=== Max Grendel ===
Max Grendel is a minor antagonist in the novel SCORPIA. He was an executive board member of SCORPIA who previously served as head chairman, having been a commander in the German secret police. He had an eye problem which causes his eyes to be permanently teary. He was the oldest member of the board at seventy-three. He also has two grandchildren named Hans and Rudi who were about the age of Alex Rider, and in his old age, it is said that he has grown sentimental. Not desiring that SCORPIA kill children the same ages as his grandchildren, he quits the organisation and Julia Rothman presents him with an executive briefcase as a retirement gift. However, once Grendel opens it, dozens of sand coloured scorpions (Parabuthus species) are released. His heart gave up before the neurotoxins killed him.

Max Grendel is played by Kevin McNally in the series. Unlike his novel counterpart, Grendel actually meets Alex face to face and lures him to Julia Rothman and SCORPIA. Instead of dying from scorpion stings, Max is shot dead by Yassen after Yassen and Alex break into his home.

=== Mr. Grin ===
Mr. Grin (real name Sean Green) is a secondary antagonist in both the novel and film adaption of Stormbreaker. He is Herod Sayle's right-hand man and butler. Grin was formerly a circus performer, throwing knives into the air and catching them in his mouth. However, when Grin's mother came to see his act one day, he was distracted by her and his knives cut off most of his tongue, and left him with a Glasgow Smile. It was after this accident he changed his name to Grin.

When it is discovered that Alex Rider is a spy, he is almost tortured by Grin. However, Alex confesses before he is able to. Later, when Sayle goes to London to execute his plan, Grin takes a cargo plane, presumably to help Sayle escape. Alex hijacks the plane, holding Grin at gunpoint, telling him to fly to London.

As they arrive, Alex parachutes out of the plane. Grin then attempts to ram Alex, but he crashes after Alex triggers a smoke-bomb he left in the plane, which causes Grin to crash and die in the docklands. In the film and Graphic novel, Alex shoots him with his mind-controlling fountain pen dart, and Grin's fate is left ambiguous.

Grin is played by Andy Serkis in the film.

=== Erik Gunter ===
Erik Gunter is a former Scottish military veteran and war hero who turned to Scorpia as a mercenary after being disillusioned by his maltreatment and neglect in a military hospital. In Scorpia Rising, he is hired to manipulate and eventually tried to kill Alex. He is the head of security at the school Alex is attending. He lures Alex into a trap and was going to kill Alex after Julius was supposed to assassinate the US Secretary of State. Alex asks him to give him a cigarette and when Gunter tries to get a cigarette, a scorpion, which was in the box, stings him. Alex then breaks his nose as he seizes Gunter's gun, sending the security head smashing into the door of the van, with the impact and venom jointly killing him.

=== Henryk ===
Henryk is a minor antagonist in Eagle Strike, serving as Damian Cray's hired pilot.

Henryk does not contribute much to the novel, his only major appearances occurring towards the end of the story, when Alex and Sabina are forced to have afternoon tea with Cray, Henryk and Yassen, where Cray explains his plans to the two teenagers, to rid the world of drugs by firing twenty-five American nuclear missiles at various drug-running countries around the world, destroying those countries and their populations in the process. After Cray's men secure Air Force One for the takeover and missile launching, Henryk prepares the plane for take-off, with the destination implied to be Russia.

When Alex and Sabina open a door on the plane and throw Cray out to his doom, a drinks trolley follows Cray into the inner engine on the port wing, disabling the engine and depressurising the cabin, just when Henryk is about to take-off at V1 speed. Henryk tries to control the plane, but it crashes. Mrs Jones later states that Henryk fractured his neck and died in the crash.

=== Charlene Hicks ===
Nurse Charlene Hicks is a minor antagonist in Snakehead, serving as Tanner's deputy, secretary, and implied lover. She shares in her boss's unorthodox sense of humour, convincing Alex that it is impossible to escape from the Kakadu hospital that illegally harvests organs, and laughing at the failed attempt of somebody who tried to escape long ago. She is later arrested by ASIS after the Snakehead's operation is blown wide open.

=== Isabel ===
Nurse Isabel is a minor antagonist in Snakehead, serving as one of the four nurses at the Kakadu hospital. She is assigned to be Alex's minder until he dies in the hospital. Despite being categorised as an antagonist, she does not do anything openly hostile to Alex. She is later arrested by ASIS.

=== Jacko ===
Jacko is a minor antagonist in Snakehead, working as one of the security guards at the Kakadu hospital involved in illegal organ harvesting. He is an Aboriginal thug who does not understand why extra security measures are being put in place around Alex when he will end up dead like everybody else who has been through the hospital. He is later arrested by ASIS when Alex foils Major Yu's operation.

=== Karl ===
Karl is a minor antagonist in the short story Spy Trap. He is, on first introduction, the head of security at the Bellhanger Abbey rest centre operated by MI6.

It is later established that Karl is a fake MI6 chauffeur who had picked Alex up from his return to the UK after thwarting General Sarov in Skeleton Key. John Crawley had welcomed him back, and Karl was the driver of the car to take Alex home. However, Karl drove them into a touring circus lorry owned by Dr Raymond Feng, drugging Alex and Crawley once inside.

At the abbey, Alex eventually realises what has happened, seeing through everyone's lies, he finds his supposedly destroyed mobile phone in Dr Feng's office. Despite calling Jack, Karl finds Alex and smashes the mobile phone, but Alex knocks him out with a plastic skeleton bone, allowing him time to effect an escape plan. Karl recovers, and Dr Feng orders him and his guards to kill Alex, before moving their information extraction operation to another location to work on Crawley.

After Alex tries to escape, Karl pursues him into the forest, and is about to shoot Alex dead. However, Karl himself is shot and killed by an MI6 assault team. He is the only antagonist in the short story to die.

Karl is an extremely muscular black man in his thirties, with very close-shaved hair (such that his scalp is visible) and a nose which looks like it has been pushed into his face. He speaks with a rough London accent and a very angry, almost violent, voice.

=== Kolo ===
Kolo is a minor villain in Ark Angel, and serves as one of Nikolei Drevin's security staff. He is assigned by Drevin to be Alex's diving buddy when Alex decides to go scuba-diving at a submerged wreck off the coast of Flamingo Bay. In reality, Drevin has told Kolo to kill Alex.

Alex and Kolo are taken out to the wreck, where they explore. Kolo tricks Alex into exploring a room on the ship, but once Alex is inside, Kolo seals him in and leaves him to run out of air. CIA agent Tamara Knight follows Kolo, and uses one of Alex's gadgets, a hand grenade disguised as one of Paul Drevin's inhalers, to blow the room open and rescue Alex. Later on, in the night, the two of them attempt to break into Nikolei Drevin's rocket launch facility, and distract the guards, especially seeing how Kolo is among them. Alex uses another gadget, this one a supposed mosquito repellant that actually attracts all manner of bugs, to contaminate the security guards' uniforms. Kolo and his associates change for guard duty, unaware of what has happened, and soon, the guards, including Kolo, are attacked by supposedly every insect on the island.

What Kolo's fate is after the bug attack is never revealed.

=== Levi Kroll ===
Levi Kroll is a minor antagonist in the novels SCORPIA, Snakehead, and Scorpia Rising. He was an executive board member of SCORPIA, having been a black ops agent for the Mossad. Kroll was known for his lack of subtlety, the loss of one eye following an accident with a pistol he had kept under his pillow for many years, and his rebellious streak. After Max Grendel's murder, Kroll was passed over for control of the next project on two occasions, and was subsequently furious when Razim was assigned for what would be Scorpia's final project. When Razim suggested taking on Alex Rider for a third time, Kroll resolved to abandon Scorpia, threatening to shoot Zeljan Kurst if anyone tried to stop him. Kurst, who had been considering killing Kroll for some time, then had him shot with a sniper, and had his body thrown in the river Thames with several objects planted on it that would lead MI6 to suspect danger at the Cairo International College of Arts and Education.

=== Razim's Men ===
Razim's Men are secondary independent antagonists in Never Say Die. They are six Berbers and former employees of Abdul-Aziz Al-Rahim (and possibly SCORPIA) who fell into financial difficulty after Razim was killed in Scorpia Rising. Alex first sees three of them at a coffee bar while he gets a coke and his taxi driver, Yusuf, asks them directions to Razim's fort. During this conversation, the men tell Yusuf to abandon Alex at the fort (presumably for money).

Later at the fort, the men arrive in an old dump truck with various weapons to try to kill Alex, who gives them the nicknames "Bandage", "Skullcap", "Silver Cross", "Baseball Bat", "Ant", and "Dec" after their distinguishing features since he doesn't know their real names. Alex takes them out one by one using salt crystals, a cannonball, and a cactus tied to a clothes line. He is able to knock out "Skullcap", "Baseball Bat", and "Bandage" (who accidentally shoots "Dec"), then confronts "Ant" and "Silver Cross". "Bandage" recovers too quickly and tries to stab Alex with a knife, but is shot and killed by the Egyptian Secret Service, who arrest the surviving members.

The men's identification using nicknames is very similar to that of Force Three.

=== Colin Maguire ===
Colin Maguire is a minor independent antagonist in Never Say Die. He is a bully at Elmer E. Robinson High School that Alex goes to while in the care of Sabina Pleasure's family. He has curly black hair, bad skin, freckles, and a body suffering from a bad diet. Like his partner, Clayton Miller, he is hostile toward Alex, calling him "England", and mocking about Alex's parents being dead. Colin is younger than Clayton.

Before Alex leaves for the airport, he encounters them harassing a ten year old and intervenes. Colin attacks Alex with a switchblade, but first has his attack redirected so it cuts Clayton's arm, and then punches a lamppost when Alex blocks his strike, breaking several fingers. He is later mentioned to have been arrested.

=== Clayton Miller ===
Clayton Miller is a minor independent antagonist in Never Say Die. He is a bully at Elmer E. Robinson High School who has blond hair, and a lazy eye. Unlike his partner Colin, he works out obsessively. When attempting to pinion Alex after sneaking up from behind, he gets cut in the arm when Alex redirects Colin's switchblade attack. He is later mentioned to have been hospitalized.

=== Nile ===
Nile is a contract killer for the crime organisation Scorpia and one of the main antagonists in the novel Scorpia. He acts as Rothman's henchman, bodyguard, representative and assassin. He is a black man who suffers from vitiligo. Nile was the second best in his class of assassination. According to Julia Rothman, he could have been the first if it was not for his "rather annoying weakness" (later revealed to be his fear of heights).

Nile first encounters Alex in the Widow's Palace. After capturing Alex for trespassing, he locks Alex in a flooding room to kill him. After Alex joins Scorpia, Nile becomes his friend. He accompanies Alex to Scorpia's island, Malagosto, for training, and later helps Alex in his mission to kill Mrs. Jones. When Alex climbs onto the hot-air balloon to stop Invisible Sword from activating, Nile is sent after him, where Alex learns about Nile's fear of heights. Using this to taunt and distract his foe, Alex then slices open the hot air balloon's gas pipe, causing an explosion, and knocking off the balloon's basket. The explosion not only destroys the basket (Alex survives by holding onto the balloon's ropes), but also knocks Nile's body (which was set aflame) off the balloon, sending him falling to his death.

Nile is portrayed by Jason Wong in the series. Instead of being portrayed as a black man with vitiligo and a fear of heights, Nile is portrayed as Asian, fearless, ruthless, and outright hates Alex unlike his novel counterpart. Instead of falling to his death, he tries to assassinate Alex at the end of SCORPIA only to get killed by Yassen.

=== Njenga ===
Njenga is a minor antagonist in Crocodile Tears, a Nigerian guard who acts as Desmond McCain's chief enforcer. He is described as being a skilled tracker whose thrill for the hunt borders on sadism.

In Kenya when Alex escapes McCain sends Njenga after Alex. Njenga chases Alex until the dam. Alex makes the dam explode and Njenga falls to his death and his body is washed away.

=== Dragana Novak ===
Lieutenant Colonel Dragana Novak is a secondary villainess in Never Say Die. She is a former lieutenant colonel in the Serbian Air Force, until she was court-martialled and expelled from duty after fighting a fellow pilot in the barracks, and severely wounding him, to the point where he was hospitalised. It was at this time she received a call from the Grimaldi twins, requiring her unique services as a pilot, in exchange for two hundred thousand pounds. Novak, an alcoholic, accepted straight away.

The plan involves sending Novak to England, to infiltrate the Suffolk Air Show, and steal a Super Stallion helicopter after murdering the two USAF pilots who were to fly the helicopter at the show's finale. Novak, disguised as a St John Ambulance volunteer called Jane Smith, infiltrates the show, and kills the pilots with an undetectable ceramic dart gun. Then, disguising herself as a pilot, she boards the helicopter and flies it to an abandoned farm, where Grimaldi operatives immobilise the helicopter and disguise it as a windmill.

Novak is seen again, when Alex boards the Grimaldi twins' yacht, the Quicksilver. She is sleeping in one of the staterooms on board when Alex distracts the guards, 'Skunk' and Frankie "The Flame" Stallone, and boards the yacht, looking for Jack Starbright. When he accidentally encounters Novak in her stateroom, they fight, and Novak shoots Alex, who is saved by his passport and mobile phone, which protected him from the shot. Novak is later accidentally shot by Stallone when Alex makes his escape.

After the Grimaldi twins hear that Novak has been hospitalised and is therefore unable to complete Operation Steel Claw, they visit her in hospital, where she suggests they get her cousin, Slavko, also a pilot, as a replacement. After the twins agree to do so, they kill Dragana with sharpened wires they conceal in roses and thrust them up her nose and into her brain.

Physically speaking, Dragana Novak is short and overweight, with round shoulders, leathery skin, and dark red hair which is "cut so badly that it stood straight out on one side of her head and curled in on the other", as well as grey teeth, discoloured by her fondness for wine and cigarettes. Her legs are described as ugly, with "hideous feet" and toes with thick and yellow nails that seem to belong to an old person. She also has a weakness for money and splashing the cash, as seen when she goes shopping in Saint-Tropez after stealing the helicopter, buying a nightdress that would have cost a twelfth of her annual Air Force pay, as well as drinking three bottles of wine and becoming intoxicated during lunch on the day she is shot by Stallone, in addition to fantasising about jewellery, fast cars and expensive chocolates.

=== Slavko Novak ===
Slavko Novak is a minor villain in Never Say Die. He is hired by the Grimaldi twins after his cousin and predecessor, Dragana Novak, is unintentionally shot by Frankie "The Flame" Stallone and then killed by the Grimaldi twins. The twins ask Novak as a replacement helicopter pilot for kidnapping fifty-two children from Oxfordshire's private Linton Hall Preparatory School and holding them to ransom for three hundred million pounds. Slavko was suggested by Dragana as a replacement, because he works as a test pilot for a jet company.

The twins contact Slavko and ask him to come to England immediately and pilot the Super Stallion, now outfitted with an electromagnetic plate stolen from an American university, to capture one of the school's buses, driven by their operative Jane Vosper, from the motorway as it takes the schoolchildren to a theatre to see a Shakesperean play, and deposit it onto their train, the Midnight Flyer, which will take it to their base in Wales. In return, the twins promise to pay Novak fifty thousand pounds. Initially, he agrees, but changes his mind at the last moment, asking for double, making it one hundred thousand pounds, which he will then use to take his extramarital affair with a waitress to the next level by having her go to the country for the weekend with him. The twins agree to his new price and give him his cheque before he leaves for his mission.

Novak does as the twins ask him, picking up the bus with the stolen plate and depositing it onto a flat-bed car attached to the Midnight Flyer; however, Alex has climbed aboard, holding onto the bus's underside. Novak is then told to fly the helicopter to an RV point, and then signal a getaway driver with a red button in the helicopter, once he is five miles from his final destination. In reality, due to Novak's greed, possibility of exposing the plan, and possibly outliving his usefulness, the button was actually fitted by the Grimaldi twins, and triggers an instantaneous self-destruct system when pressed. The helicopter blows up, killing Novak.

Slavko Novak is stated as being unhappily married, with four children (all of whose names begin with the letter 'M') who disrespect him.

=== Magnus Payne ===
Magnus "Kaspar" Payne is one of the secondary antagonists in the novel Ark Angel. As Kaspar, he is the leader of Force Three, an eco-terrorist organisation created by Nikolei Drevin to act as a scapegoat for his plan to destroy the Pentagon (see Ark Angel). Kaspar is described as having his head and face completely tattooed to resemble the planet Earth. As Magnus Payne, chief of security on Drevin's island, Flamingo Bay, he wears a latex mask. Payne, as Kaspar, was sent up to the Ark Angel station to arm the bomb planted there. When Alex arrives on the station to remove the bomb threat, Kaspar attacks him with a Sabatier chef's knife. In the fight that follows, Alex disarms Kaspar and blinds him by exposing him to the light of the Sun. He then kicks Kaspar away, into the path of the knife, which kills Kaspar when it slices open a major artery.

Kaspar is the second major antagonist to still be alive after the main antagonist of the story (Nikolei Drevin) is killed. The first was Yassen Gregorovitch, who first killed Herod Sayle himself in Stormbreaker, and later died in Eagle Strike shortly after the main antagonist, Damian Cray, was killed.

=== Quombi ===
Quombi is a minor antagonist in Snakehead, serving as one of the security guards at the illegal organ-stealing Kakadu hospital run by Major Yu's snakehead. He is an Aboriginal thug, like his partner, Jacko. Quombi is younger than Jacko.

Quombi is stated to have spent a third of his life in prison, before being recruited by the snakehead. He is said to enjoy his work, and taunting the unwilling organ donors until they die. However, he is stated to be greedy, attracted only by money, and is unhappy when he is told to observe Alex until the morning, when he is to lose his eyes to a blind reality TV producer, and will not be getting any overtime pay.

Alex defeats Quombi, by playing on his greed. Alex throws the last of his explosive baht coins out, distracting Quombi long enough so that he does not see the filing cabinet that hits him on his head and knocks him unconscious. Quombi is later arrested by ASIS at the end of the novel, where it is revealed that his skull is fractured.

=== Raoul ===
Raoul is a minor antagonist in Eagle Strike who works as a deckhand on Yassen's boat. He also assists Yassen with his missions, planting a bomb in the home of Sabina's parents. He does a poor job, planting the bomb too far away from Mr. Pleasure's room for the blast to kill anyone. Yassen nearly kills him for this failure, but Raoul redeems himself by knocking Alex unconscious after he infiltrates Yassen's boat and knocks out their confederate, Franco. Raoul is not seen afterwards.

=== Charlie Roper ===
Charles "Charlie" Roper is a minor antagonist in Eagle Strike. He is an agent of the NSA who helps Damian Cray in his plan to eradicate drugs from the world. After realizing that he would be stuck at his current position and would not earn more money, he decided to sell the codes for the Milstar security locks for the U.S. nuclear arsenal. He decides to sell the codes to Cray at the sum of two million dollars. Under the cover of the Gameslayer system, Cray purchased a large number of supercomputers for a cryptanalysis department for Roper, who successfully incorporated the decryption system on a flash drive compatible with the system in Air Force One.

Cray later discovered that Roper's actions as a gambling addict had attracted the attention of Edward Pleasure, and had Yassen try to kill Pleasure with a bomb, critically wounding him and removing him as a threat, but Cray had decided that Roper had become careless. At their last meeting, watched by Alex, Roper demanded the money Cray owed him, causing Cray to lure him into a sealed room, where he deposited two million dollars – in nickels (quarters in later editions), onto Roper, crushing him to death beneath the weight of the coins.

In the TV show, he was killed by Cray because Charlie refused to be part of Cray's plan any longer. His death was being shot dead by Cray instead of being killed by having two million dollars' worth of nickels/quarters just like in the novel. Charlie is more helpful to Alex in the show as helped him pose as a top gamer named K7 to infiltrate Cray's Feathered Serpent project.

=== The Salesman ===
The Salesman is a short-term antagonist in Skeleton Key. He is a Mexican from Mexico City. The Salesman's main line of work, as his name suggests, is selling illegal products, such as weapons and drugs. He was the one who sold the uranium to Sarov. CIA agent Tom Turner was placed undercover as a cocaine purchaser to engage a friendship between him and The Salesman on his boat, The Mayfair Lady.

Eventually, The Salesman discovers Turner's real identity and attempts to kill him. However, Alex sneaks onto the boat and sets it on fire. This causes a distraction, allowing Alex to save Turner by shooting The Salesman with a stun-dart (commenting, "He got the wrong number."). After Alex and Turner jump overboard, the Salesman tries to ram them with his boat, but Sarov's assistant, Conrad, had set a bomb on the boat, which is detonated, killing the Salesman and his crew, as well as sinking the boat.

=== Rick Shaw ===
Richard "Rick" Shaw is a minor character in Snakehead. He is an associate of Anan Sukit who is brought along to take photos of Sukit's meeting with Ash. Later, he attempts to salvage what he can from the destroyed offices of the Chada Trading Company to prevent any potential evidence from getting out. Ash claims that Shaw escorted him to a meeting with Sukit's deputy, but due to Ash secretly being a mole it is unclear if said meeting ever even took place.

=== Skoda ===
Skoda is an antagonist who has a minor role in Point Blanc, and is the main antagonist in the short story Alex Rider: Secret Weapon. His criminal name comes from the manufacturer of his car. He is a drug dealer who hooked many of the pupils at Alex's school on drugs.

Skoda first appears in Point Blanc. Alex follows him from his school to his boat on the Thames, where he manufactures his drugs, intending revenge for hooking his friend Colin on drugs. He then picks seals the doors with wire, unties the boat from the jetty where it is moored, and picks up the boat with a crane, severely injuring Skoda and his fellow drug dealer Mike Beckett, and is forced to drop it on a police conference center when the crane's power is cut off. The conference centre was practically destroyed in the process.

He appears again in the short story Alex Rider: Secret Weapon, this time as the main antagonist. Here, it is revealed that he grew up in Dagenham, in the care of foster parents, after his mother walked out on him when he was three years old. At school, he was a disruptive influence and a bully, getting himself excluded from two schools, refusing to pay attention, and getting involved as a drug dealer in a gang at a young age, as well as being a drug user. At sixteen, the entire gang leadership died in a turf war, allowing him to go into business for himself, buying a barge in Putney and scientific equipment from across London, providing him with a lair and supplies to produce drugs from. He also alters the purity of the drugs that he sells, adding such products as glucose powder, dried milk and rat poison, making the drugs go further and increasing his profits.

After spending two months of a twenty-year sentence in HMP Doncaster, for possession of drugs with intent to supply (worsened by the fact that the drugs were impure, dangerous and possibly lethal), Skoda (whose real name is revealed to be Brian Smith [Jake Edwards in the American Version]) plots to kill Alex Rider and to escape. He does this by self-harming in the exercise yard and being taken to the prison hospital wing for night, put in the same room as terminally ill fellow inmate Harry Baker (known as 'Spider' because of the huge, self-made tattoo of a tarantula on his face), who is serving a life sentence for killing a policeman in a bank robbery. Skoda suffocates Spider to death with a pillow, then takes the body's place by switching beds and drawing a copy of Spider's tattoo on his own face with a marker pen; when the paramedics arrive, they carry Skoda off to Doncaster Royal Infirmary.

After escaping from the hospital morgue that he is taken to, Skoda steals clothes and money from a patient, and a car from a doctor, and drives to Chelsea. There, he stalks Alex for a while, before disguising himself as a security guard and attacking him in the Victoria and Albert Museum, where Alex is on a school trip to a weapons and warfare exhibition. He attacks Alex with a sword from one of the displays, but before he can kill Alex, supply science teacher (and undercover MI6 agent) Miss Maxwell (also known as Miss Treat in some versions) arrives and shoots Skoda in the shoulder. Skoda then non-fatally stabs Miss Maxwell and flees, taking Alex's friend Tom Harris hostage. Over the phone, he forces Alex to meet him at the top of the crane which Alex used to lift his boat and then threatens to kill Tom if he doesn't throw himself off, or show up in thirty minutes. However, thanks to Alex's karate skills and Tom's acting skills, the two boys manage to overpower Skoda, who loses his balance and falls to his death, while Tom and Alex climb back down.

He is described as "in his twenties, bald, and had two broken stumps where his teeth should have been and five metal studs in his ear". When he returns in Alex Rider: Secret Weapon, his face has been damaged by the incident in Point Blanc, and appears almost deformed. It is also said in this story that he has piercings in his tongue, nose and nipples as well, as well as the word "Loosie" tattooed on his arm, showing that he is illiterate. The tattoo refers to Lucy, a girl he once stalked.

=== 'Skunk' ===
Skunk is the name given to a minor villain from Never Say Die. He is a henchman of the Grimaldi twins.

'Skunk' is stated to have been a drug addict from the age of twelve, earning his nickname, and this has caused a lot of brain damage to him, as well as affecting the skin around his eyes and mouth, making him look like a dead man. How he came to work for the Grimaldis is never elaborated upon.

'Skunk' is first seen in Saint-Tropez guarding the Grimaldi twins' yacht, the Quicksilver, and is distracted from his position at the gangway when Alex self-destructs his laptop computer and sneaks on board. When Stallone accidentally detonates Alex's gas bomb, 'Skunk' suffers from having his clothes ignite, as well as having one of his eyes swelling shut and his lips swelling so that he cannot talk properly. When Frankie Stallone tries to kill Alex at Needle Point, 'Skunk' is ordered to film it, but Alex fights with Stallone, causing the filming to go awry, such as 'Skunk' missing the scene where Alex is thrown off the cliff, much to his dismay, but getting the scene where Alex stabs Stallone in the neck with a nail.

'Skunk' reappears at the Grimaldi twins' disused former coke plant in Wales, seen only towards the end of the novel, where he attempts to stop Alex and the hostages during their escape, briefly fighting their guard, Ted Philby, before shooting him to death. 'Skunk' is put to work fueling the engine of the twins' train, The Midnight Flyer, as it tries to pursue the coach when Alex and Jack rescue the fifty-two hostages and try to get them out. When Alex drops a thermos full of fuel into the train's smokestack, it explodes, destroying the train and boiling 'Skunk' to death with water from the boiler.

=== Frankie "The Flame" Stallone ===
Frankie Stallone, nicknamed "The Flame" because of the fiery tattoo on the back of one of his hands, is an Italian-American former Mafia operative who works for the Grimaldi family, and is a secondary antagonist in Never Say Die. He is from the Bronx area of New York and is stated to have worked for the Grimaldi family for two, possibly three, generations.

Stallone was first known to be employed by Carlo Grimaldi, the father of main antagonists Giovanni and Eduardo, as his bodyguard. However, he was later ordered to kill Carlo by the twins, who sought to take over the criminal empire their family had created; Stallone shot Carlo in his own Jacuzzi tub, and became a trusted confidante of the twins.

Stallone is first encountered by Alex in Saint-Tropez, where the twins' yacht, the Quicksilver, is moored in the harbour and guarded by Stallone and his partner, 'Skunk'. Alex self-destructs his laptop computer to distract Stallone and 'Skunk' long enough to board the Quicksilver and try and search for Jack Starbright. Stallone and Skunk later encounter Alex on the yacht when he fights Dragana Novak, and Stallone accidentally causes a gas explosion that injures everybody except Alex. In Stallone's case, he lost his eyebrows, injured his shoulder and had his face burned. He later reports to his masters what happened, during breakfast, and also seals Dragana Novak's fate when he says that she can no longer fly the stolen Super Stallion.

Stallone and 'Skunk' are then informed by their masters to kill Alex by drowning him at Needle Point by chaining his ankles to concrete blocks and throwing him in the sea, when Alex is captured in their villa overhearing the twins' meeting with their henchman Derek Vosper. Stallone is put to work as the executioner, whilst 'Skunk' films it. Despite being stabbed on the side of the neck and head with a sharp nail, Stallone succeeds in throwing Alex into the sea, but the murder attempt fails when Alex is rescued by MI6 agent Ben Daniels.

Stallone reappears later on, at the twins' disused coke plant in Wales that serves as their base, as the head of security and being responsible for guarding the fifty-two schoolchildren who have been taken hostage for a three hundred million pound ransom. He is later given orders to execute all hostages, and Jack Starbright, forcibly employed as their nurse, when the operation is over and the ransom is received. When Alex reunites with Jack, they stage a plan to bypass security and get the hostages out. Part of this plan involves dealing with Stallone: Jack distracts his attention whilst Alex, who Stallone thinks is dead, makes himself look like a ghost, in order to frighten him, so that Jack can knock him out and lock him up.

The plan works, but Stallone is later found and freed. He then drives the twins' train, The Midnight Flyer, with Skunk and the twins aboard, in order to track down the escaping bus and kill everybody on it before it leaves the coke plant. Alex then improvises a grenade from Jane Vosper's tea thermos, filled with diesel from the bus, and drops it into The Midnight Flyer's smokestack, where it overheats and explodes, causing the train to crash into a cliff face next to a tunnel that the bus has just driven through, killing Stallone.

=== Eva Stellenbosch ===
Eva Stellenbosch is a secondary antagonist in the novel Point Blanc. She is co-director of Point Blanc Academy for young men, along with Dr. Hugo Grief. She was formerly an interrogator for the South African Secret Police, and was Miss South Africa in weightlifting for five consecutive years. Her strength is proven when she bent a solid metal poker until it became U-shaped, without breaking a sweat. She had known Dr. Grief for twenty-six years. She is described as looking like "a man in drag", having huge muscles and a facial structure that "wasn't quite human". She also has wisps of bright ginger hair and a high domed forehead.

Along with Dr. Grief, she organises the Gemini Project (see Dr. Hugo Grief), having raised Hugo's clones for the first fourteen years of their lives. She is killed by Wolf when the SAS raid Point Blanc Academy. Wolf shoots her in the leg, causing her to stumble backwards and trip into a third-story window, shattering it and falling to her death. However, she shoots Wolf three times, although his body armor stops the shots.

Eva Stellenbosch is also portrayed as a smoker. At various points in the book, she is pictured smoking cigars.

She is portrayed by Ana Ularu in the series.

=== Leonard Straik ===
Leonard "Leo" Straik is a secondary antagonist in the novel Crocodile Tears. He runs the company Greenfields that Alex takes a school trip to. He is also a close friend of Desmond McCain, the chief antagonist of the novel, and is known to be the inventor of the gene gun that is demonstrated at Greenfields.

Straik supplies various countries in Africa, including Kenya and Uganda, with his own genetically engineered seeds that will, when activated by a strange "mushroom soup" substance, make the crops poisonous. Alex is sent to Greenfields by MI6 under the guise of a school trip to obtain data on Straik's computer. It is in the act of stealing this information that he discovers Straik's association with McCain. Alex considers Straik to be something of a sadist, especially after seeing the greenhouse marked Poison Dome, which is filled with the most dangerous creatures, plants, and natural chemicals on the planet. It also acts as his method of killing people who may inform the authorities of his work, such as the whistle-blower Philip Masters.

McCain mentions later on in the novel that he had killed Straik by shoving a poisonous Cone snail from the Poison Dome down his throat, as he did not want to share the money with anyone.

=== Anan Sukit ===
Anan Sukit is a minor antagonist in the novel Snakehead. He is the head of the Bangkok Snakehead, owned by Major Winston Yu.

Sukit first meets Alex while he and Ash are undercover as Afghan refugees, trying to obtain Snakehead's help in illegally immigrating to Australia. Sukit, however, is aware that Alex is undercover, having been warned by Major Yu. Sukit orders that Alex was to retrieve the fake passports they needed from the Snakehead.

When Alex goes to collect the papers, he is kidnapped by Sukit's men and taken to fight in an arena. Alex, cheating, defeats his opponent, a man named 'Sunthorn', in the fight. The gamblers, who had all bet on 'Sunthorn', are enraged, leading Sukit to attack Alex. However, Ben Daniels shorts out the lights, giving Alex a chance to flee the arena.

Later, when Alex attempts to escape from the arena in a swamp boat, Sukit approaches him with a gun. Just before he shoots Alex, Daniels shoots Sukit in the back three times, killing him.

Sukit is described as a short Asian man who wears a strange mixture between a suit and combat clothes. He has no ears, as they were cut off during a deal which was ambushed by a rival Bangkok gang.

=== 'Sunthorn' ===
Sunthorn is a minor antagonist in Snakehead. He is employed by the snakehead as a Muay Thai fighter in an illegal betting operation in Thailand, where unwilling fighters are kidnapped and brought to 'Sunthorn', who, in effect, beats them to death in front of the crowd, who bet on how long the opponent will last.

'Sunthorn' is defeated by Alex, who was captured by Anan Sukit and brought to the arena. After 'Sunthorn' beats Alex up in the first round, Alex resorts to cheating to escape. 'Sunthorn' has water spat into his face by Alex, who then knocks him unconscious. He is presumably killed when the building burns down.

=== Swain ===
Nurse Swain is a minor antagonist in Snakehead. She is one of the nurses who works at the snakehead's Kakadu organ harvesting clinic. Despite being categorised as an antagonist, she does not do anything openly hostile towards Alex. She is later arrested by ASIS at the end of the novel.

=== Bill Tanner ===
Dr. William "Bill" Tanner is a minor antagonist in Snakehead. He is an Australian doctor who works in an illegal organ harvesting clinic at Kakadu National Park, owned by Major Yu, where Alex was sent to be killed after he was captured. He was in charge of removing Alex's organs for transplants. According to the Alex Rider Mission Dossier, Tanner had been sacked from his previous job and struck off the Australian medical register for telling a patient she could receive an instant heart transplant if she paid him one million dollars. In the novel, he tells Alex of all the security systems in the hospital, which helps Alex to escape by sea after blowing up the plane that brought him there. After Alex escapes and sets fire to the hospital, Tanner survives the attack and sends a Huey helicopter after Alex. It is later revealed that Tanner commits suicide, apparently as an order of Major Yu's .

Despite being a doctor and surgeon, Tanner has several vices, including alcohol, cigarettes and gambling. He also does not present the image of a doctor, dressing only in open shirts and jeans, without a white coat on.

He is named after Bill Tanner from the James Bond movie For Your Eyes Only.

=== Varga ===
Varga is a minor antagonist in Snakehead. He is a technician who helps Winston Yu to develop the detonation procedure for Royal Blue, and who Alex witnesses demonstrating the procedure to Major Yu and Captain de Wynter. He is later arrested by ASIS at the end of the novel.

=== Vaudrey ===
Vaudrey is a minor antagonist in the short story Spy Trap. He is initially presented as a security guard at the Bellhanger Abbey rest home for MI6, with responsibility for the guard dog Brutus. In actuality, he is a minor criminal hired by Dr Feng, as part of his goal to extract information from Alex on MI6. He is later arrested by MI6 at the story's conclusion.

=== Nadia Vole ===
Nadia Vole (otherwise known as Fräulein Vole) is Herod Sayle's German assistant. She is described as being broad-shouldered and severe, having blonde hair, a moon-shaped face, wearing wire framed spectacles, and also wears a smear of yellow lipstick. She has a thick German accent and is described to walk like a soldier. She is killed when the tank containing Sayle's Portuguese Man o' War is destroyed by Alex. She is stung by the jellyfish when it lands directly on top of her.

She is portrayed by Missi Pyle in the film Stormbreaker.

=== Derek Vosper ===
Derek Vosper is a minor antagonist in Never Say Die. He is the husband of Jane Vosper, and works as the curator of the Ashmolean Museum in Oxfordshire.

Vosper is first seen at the Grimaldi twins' villa in Saint-Tropez, where he discusses part of Operation Steel Claw with the twins. From his information, Alex and MI6 at first believe the twins are trying to steal Mesoamerican gold artefacts from the museum, but bugging his office and the museum disproves this theory. Alex works out that it is, in fact, Vosper's wife, Jane, who the twins are going after, after seeing a poster for a Shakespeare play that Vosper mentioned at the villa.

Vosper is later widowed after the twins poison his wife, and is later still arrested by MI6, when it emerges that his wife told him the information he needed and he then sold it on to the twins.

=== Jane Vosper ===
Jane Vosper is a minor antagonist in Never Say Die. She is the inside operative of the Grimaldi twins' Operation Steel Claw, which will see them capturing fifty-two schoolchildren from Linton Hall Preparatory School in Oxfordshire and hold them to a three hundred million pound ransom from their parents. She works at the school, with one of her duties involving driving a bus. She is nicknamed 'Mrs T' by the schoolchildren, because of the tea thermos that she always carries with her.

The fifty-two hostages are on the bus which is taking them to see a Shakespearean play, and also has a security guard from the school, a schoolteacher in charge of the party, and Vosper as driver. Despite the bus being surrounded by security agents from the school, Vosper tranquilizes the guard on the bus with drugged sweets, and the bus is soon picked up by the Grimaldi twins' stolen Super Stallion, with the stolen electromagnetic plate, and flown to the train that takes it to rural Wales.

Once the hostages are brought to the Grimaldi twins' former coke plant that serves as their base, their henchman Frankie 'The Flame' Stallone orders the hostages out and into their prison, whilst Vosper is invited to afternoon tea with the Grimaldi twins, who kill her by poisoning her tea with cyanide.

=== R. V. Weinberg ===
R. V. Weinberg is an antagonist in Snakehead. He is an American reality TV producer from Miami who has gone blind, due to a serious condition, and Dr. Tanner has decided to give him Alex's eyes.

Being deprived of his eyes, together with Weinberg's lack of heart, prompts Alex to escape by knocking out Quombi, drugging the security dog, blowing one of the seaplane's floats off and turning it into a canoe, and setting the clinic on fire. In the process, Weinberg is partially set on fire and is last seen putting the fire out in a puddle, with Alex noting that more than just his eyes need medical attention now.

Despite not doing anything openly hostile towards Alex, Weinberg is regarded by Alex as somebody who is physically sickening and heartless, taking his eyes just because he has the money for it, just because he wants it, without any thought.

=== Wilcox ===
Nurse Wilcox is a minor antagonist in Snakehead. She is one of the nurses at the Kakadu organ harvesting clinic, and is meant to be Alex's anaesthetist. She is later arrested by ASIS.

=== Hermann de Wynter ===
Captain Hermann de Wynter is a minor antagonist in Snakehead. He is the Dutch captain of the snakehead's container ship, the MV Liberian Star, which is used to smuggle illegal immigrants into Australia from elsewhere.

De Wynter is stated to have worked for the snakehead for eleven years, and unquestioningly does as his superiors ask of him. He is first seen in a modified container of the Liberian Star, showing the bomb to Major Yu, with which he will destroy Reef Island. When Alex evades capture attempts by the crew after one of the smuggled refugees follows Alex after he breaks out of a modified container designed to carry people, de Wynter reports to Major Yu what has happened. Yu orders him to step up the security operations, despite the fact that the crew has had no sleep and has used every device imaginable to look everywhere on the ship. Yu also states that if Alex escapes, de Wynter should commit suicide.

Despite the crew's best intentions, Alex uses one of his exploding Baht coins to damage the Liberian Star's cargo refrigeration unit, and escape. It is later revealed, when Alex is captured and forced to attend dinner with Major Yu, that Yu himself killed de Wynter, though it is never revealed how.

=== Yannis Ariston Xenopolus ===
Yannis Ariston Xenopolus is a minor antagonist in Scorpia Rising. He is an old, terminally ill Greek billionaire worth thirty-five billion dollars and owner of a shipping empire. He becomes SCORPIA's final employer when he pays them to return the Elgin Marbles to Greece through blackmail, which he believes will be his legacy to the Greek people when he dies. He is not mentioned since the disbanding of SCORPIA at the end of the book.

He is described as being in a wheelchair, needing an oxygen mask, having "sunken cheeks, dreadful white skin, hands that are more like claws," and eyes that "had accepted death."

=== Yusuf ===
Yusuf is a minor character in Never Say Die, he is an Egyptian Taxi driver. Alex first meets him when he tells him to drive him to the Cairo Gateway bus station for a bus to Siwa, only to learn there would be no busses for two days, causing him to convince Yusuf to drive him to Siwa, and then to Razim's abandoned fort. On the way, he is convinced by men who worked for Razim to abandon Alex at the fort (presumably for more money) so they can try to kill him. After abandoning Alex, Yusuf's fate is never revealed.
