= Jeep cap =

Knit cap

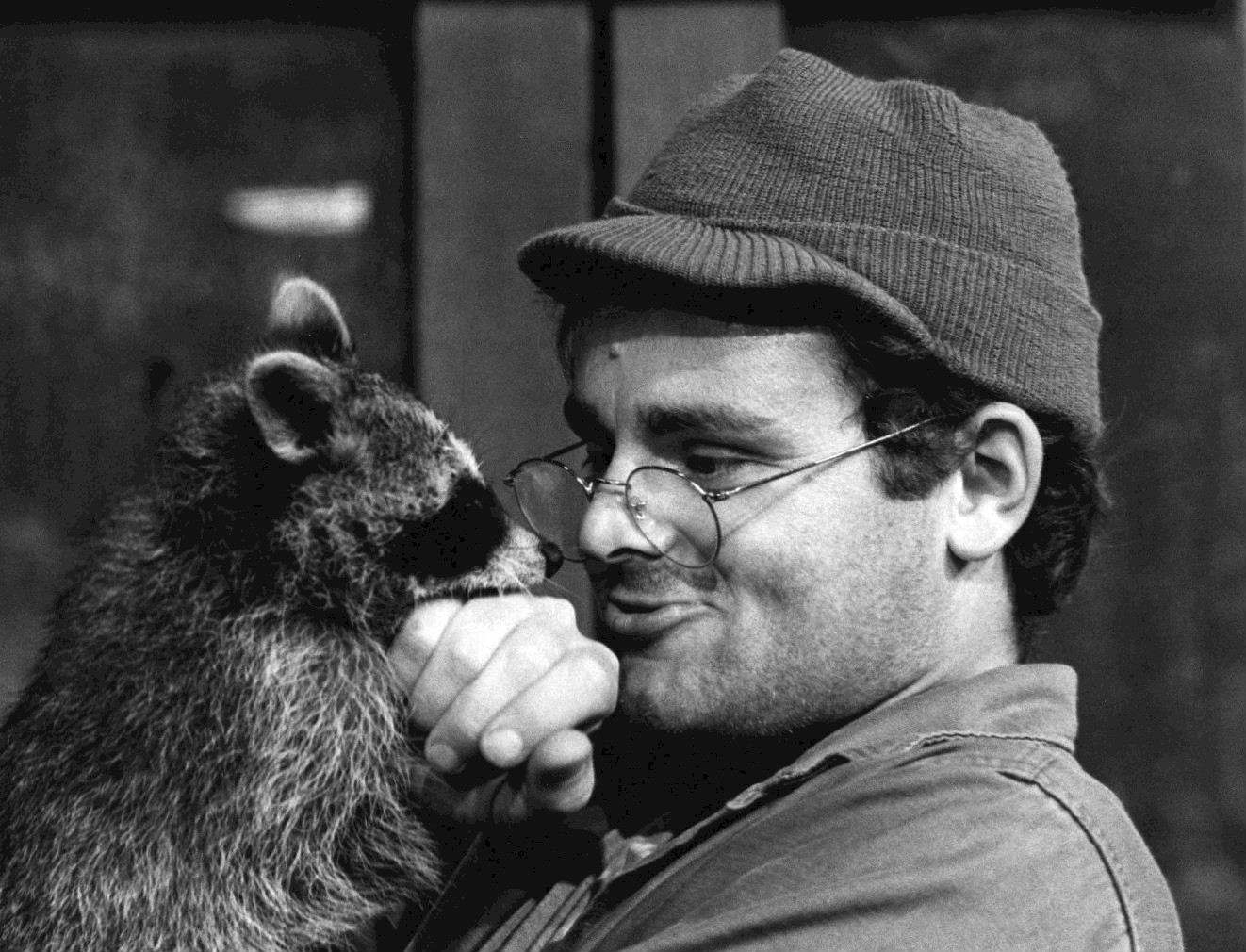
Gary Burghoff as Radar O'Reilly in M*A*S*H 1974 wearing a jeep cap, also called a Radar cap

The jeep cap, sometimes referred to as the jeep hat, originally the US Army issued Cap, Wool, Knit, M1941 is a knit cap with a short visor made mostly from knitted yarn, originally wool, but now typically acrylic. Also sometimes referred to as a "skull cap" due to its popularity with skateboarders (although the term "skullcap" is also used for a variety of completely different caps), or a "Radar cap" due to the cap being made famous by the character Radar O'Reilly from the hit US TV sitcom M*A*S*H.

== Origin ==
The "jeep cap" was first issued by the United States Army in February 1942 during World War II; the purpose of the jeep cap was to be worn underneath the heavy combat helmets to offer soldiers both extra padding and warmth. The jeep cap was originally knitted close to the head, with a six-stitch "starfish pattern" on top (supposedly to support the webbing suspension inside the helmets), with a cuff coming out like a V from the top center of the brim and around the rest of the cap, which soldiers could pull down over their ears for even more warmth. The cap was issued in four different sizes – small, medium, large, and extra large – and made of olive drab wool; perfect examples of these original jeep caps can be found being worn by Staff Sergeant Kinchloe from the sitcom Hogan's Heroes (he wore his with the brim folded up), and Radar O'Reilly from M*A*S*H (who was seldom seen without one). Another example of characters depicted wearing the cap is the WW2 movie Stalag 17.

Although made specifically for wear under the steel pot helmet, the cap alone grew to be very popular with soldiers for its casual and relaxed look and was often worn on its own, especially on night patrols. The cap was usually only issued to enlisted men, however, officers (General Patton in particular) despised the cap for its "slovenly" and "un-military" look and ordered wear of the cap without helmet to be banned and punished by a fine, with General Patton personally pulling them off a soldier's head.

The cap was eventually phased out and replaced with the standardized "Cap, Field, Cotton, O.D., With Visor" as part of the newer, layered U.S. Army M-1943 Uniform, although it continued in use until the end of the war.

=== Authentic government issued ===
The jeep cap has been continuously manufactured for the U.S. Army, however, many significant changes have been made to the cap since the original issue. The cap is now knitted very loose and deep so it can be pulled down even lower over a soldier's head and ears for more warmth (the cuff does not necessarily have to be pulled down to achieve this), and instead of the old six-stitch "starfish pattern" on top, it now features a simple, more modern four-stitch topping. The cuff is now knitted completely around the entire cap, rather than coming out like a V at the center of the brim. Modern yarns are elastic enough that they are "one-size-fits-all". Another significant change that has been made is that the cap is now manufactured in a much deeper shade of olive drab, but is also available in navy blue, and black. Probably the only thing that is the same about these and the original jeep caps are the short brims, and that they are made from knitted wool. Today's model are labeled "Cap, Knit Watch RN-93084".

=== Imitations ===
Due to the rising popularity of the jeep cap, various sports companies, such as Nike, manufacture their own version of the jeep caps: these are generally made to resemble the one issued by the government, but are made cheaply out of acrylic, rather than wool, and are also manufactured in an endless variety of commercial colors, and some cases, also have embroidery designs on them; Wal-Mart even stocks jeep caps that have brown brims and cuffs, and a camouflage cap made from fleece. These are also manufactured in "one-size-fits-all", but in most cases, because of their tighter knit, they are labeled "one size fits most". These caps are usually found in department stores as seasonal items (for autumn and winter), or sporting goods stores and stores that sell outdoor clothing. Exact and near-exact reproduction jeep caps are also manufactured by various companies for the reenactment and living history communities.

== See also ==
- List of hat styles
- Headgear of the United States Army
