= Skullcap =

Skullcap, skull-cap, or skull cap usually refers to various types of headgear. Specifically it may refer to:

== Headwear ==
- Arakhchin, traditionally worn by men and women of the South Caucasus
- Beanie (seamed cap)
- Biretta, forming part of some clerical, academic or legal dress
- Calotte (Belgium), a skullcap worn by students at Catholic universities in Belgium
- Capeline, worn under civilian hats during early modern periods
- Cervelliere, a medieval metal helmet
- Jeep cap
- Kerchief or durag, as stereotypically worn by pirates and often featuring actual skull print
- Kippah or yarmulke, worn by Jewish men
- Kufi, worn primarily by men of West African heritage
- Scrub cap, worn by healthcare professionals while performing procedures
- Scrum cap, worn by rugby players
- Sindhi cap worn by Sindhi people of Pakistan, and others
- Songkok
- Taqiyah (cap), worn by some Muslim men
- Tubeteika, a Central Asian cap
- Tuque, a knit hat
- Zucchetto, worn by Catholic clergy

== Plants and fungi ==
- Galerina marginata, a highly toxic mushroom also known as "deadly skullcap" or "autumn skullcap"
- Scutellaria, a genus of flowering plants also known as "skullcaps"
  - Scutellaria baicalensis ("Baikal skullcap", "Chinese skullcap"), an herb native to eastern Asia
  - Scutellaria lateriflora ("blue skullcap", "American skullcap", "mad dog skullcap", "side-flowering skullcap"), a perennial herb native to North America

== See also ==
- Calvaria (skull), the top part of the skull
