= List of Lorien Legacies characters =

This is a list of characters appearing in the Lorien Legacies series of young adult science fiction books, written by James Frey, Jobie Hughes, and Greg Boose under the collective pseudonym Pittacus Lore.

== The Lorien Elders ==
In the Lorien Legacies series, the Loric Elders are the most powerful among the Garde. The Elders act as protectors and rulers of the planet Lorien. Seven of them once went to Greece on Earth and became known as the Seven Sages of Greece. Originally there were ten Lorien Elders, but the tenth Elder supposedly dies during the Secret Wars, a conflict between the Loric and the Mogadorians. After the Secret Wars, the Elders discover the Phoenix Stones, objects that give Lorien the Legacies (superpowers) and the Chimaera. The Elders include:

=== Bias ===
Bias is an Elder of Lorien.

=== Chilon ===
Chilon is an Elder of Lorien.

=== Cleobulus ===
Cleobulus is an Elder of Lorien.

=== Loridas ===
Loridas is the last remaining elder on Lorien. He can switch between times within his age. When the Mogadorians invade Lorien, he sacrifices himself so that Ten can escape with his powers. Loridas is mentioned by the character Crayton in The Power of Six. he makes his first but brief appearance in The Last Days Of Lorien. He is seen by Sandor, Nine's Cêpan, and is revealed to be the one who puts the charm on the Garde before they leave Earth.

His known Legacies include:

- Aeternus – The ability to change between ages that the user has already lived through (This is not an actual Legacy, some Garde are born with this natural power).
- Charm Casting – Described as a learned ability rather than an actual legacy. He uses it to place the charm on the Garde, preventing them from being killed out of order.
- Telekinesis – All Garde can move objects with their mind.
- Enhancement – All Garde have enhanced strength, speed, senses, reflexes, endurance, and durability.

=== Myson ===
Myson is possibly an Elder of Lorien

=== Periander ===
Periander is an Elder of Lorien.

=== Pittacus Lore ===
The leader of the Lorien Elders, Pittacus Lore is immortal and is about 10,000 years old. He has lived on Earth for the past twelve years and is the fictional author of the series. According to Fate of Ten, Lore is believed to have all 74 of the Legacies or superhuman powers known to Loric, as well as an unknown number that he developed naturally. In The Fall of Five, the character Malcolm says that Pittacus Lore died from fatal battle wounds. Four, Nine, or Eight were thought to be the return of Pittacus Lore because they can communicate through dreams with Setrákus Ra, as Pittacus did. Four emerges as the Garde who will assume Pittacus Lore's role when he develops the Ximic legacy, allowing him to copy and master any legacy he observes.

=== Setrákus Ra ===
Setrákus Ra was the tenth Elder of Lorien. He is from Aeternus and is the great-grandfather of Ten and grandfather of Raylan. Pittacus Lore gives Setrákus Ra a purplish scar around his neck once the Elders discover Setrákus Ra's plans for their planet and his psychotic nature. However, Lore banishes Ra from the Elders and Lorien rather than carrying out his execution. Once banished, Ra changes his genetic code to look more like a Mogadorian so he can take over their planet. In The Revenge of Seven, Setrákus Ra is the leader of the Mogadorians and sworn enemy to the nine Garde; he is revealed as the missing tenth Elder of Lorien.

=== Solon ===
Solon is an Elder of Lorien.

=== Thales ===
Thales is an Elder of Lorien.

== The Garde ==
As described in I Am Number Four, the Garde are the protectors of the planet Lorien. They develop Legacies or superhuman powers during their teenage years. When Lorien is conquered by the Mogadorians, ten Garde children are sent from their planet to Earth where they are separated. A charm is cast upon the children to protect them from harm by the Mogadorians and ensures that they must be killed in order, one through nine, as long as they are kept apart. The Power of Six reveals that the children were chosen by the planet of Lorien to follow in the footsteps of the ten original Lorien Elders. If nature is left alone to run its course, these ten will eventually develop Legacies that will exceed that of the original Elders.

Each Garde that came to Earth has a Phoenix Stone inside their chest. The Phoenix Stones are objects that the Elders discovered after the Secret War that give Lorien the Legacies and the Chimaera.

== The Phoenix Stones ==
The Phoenix Stones are not stones but objects that the Elders discovered after the Secret War. The Phoenix Stones give Lorien the Legacies and the Chimaera. The Nine Garde that came to Earth each have a Phoenix Stone inside their chest. The Phoenix Stones jump-start Lorien's ecosystem when the Garde returns to Lorien. The Phoenix Stones' current form is unknown, but some ideas include:

=== Number One ===
Number One is a 14-year-old girl killed in Malaysia, according to the back cover of the novel, I Am Number Four. In the film of the same name, One is mentioned but not seen because she died when Number Four was nine. Her history is revealed in I am Number Four: The Lost Files: The Fallen Legacies. One was discovered by the Mogadorians when the police took her photograph after she attempted shoplifting to impress a boy.

One is described as rebellious, with tan skin and long blonde hair. She often skipped training lessons to spend time with a boy named Wade. She developed her first Legacy, but it was too late to save her life because her telekinesis was off and her earthquake powers did not last long. She was killed when a Mogadorian came from behind and stabbed her with a sword. The Mogadorians took her body to infiltrate her memories for any information on the other Garde members. Adamus Sutekh, the teenage son of a Mogadorian General, is selected for the infiltration experiment.

During Adamus's infiltration, One appears as a ghost and controls the memories Adamus sees. She convinces Adamus to switch sides and try to help Two and Three. One continues to appear to Adamus, but her ghostly image slowly fades away. When Adamus attempts to save One, she says she cannot be saved. Her goal was for Adamus to see the evil side of his family and join the Garde. When Adamus professes his love for her, One shares a kiss with him before fading away forever. In The Forgotten Ones, her memory lives on through Adamus.

One's Legacies include:

- Terric – With this Legacy, a Garde can emit seismic vibrations and create highly controlled earthquakes.
- Telekinesis – Like all Garde, One can move objects with her mind.
- Enhancement – All Garde possess enhanced physical strength, speed, reflexes, endurance, and durability.

=== Number Two ===
Number Two, or Maggie Hoyle, is a twelve-year-old Loric girl with glasses, freckles, and reddish brown hair. She creates an Internet message in an attempt to find the other Garde after her Cêpan is killed by Mogadorians. Because of this message, the Mogadorians find and murder Two in London, England.

In The Power of Six, the characters Four, Six, and Samuel discuss Two's post. The post reads, "Nine, now eight, is the rest of you out there?". Six and her Cêpan Katarina responded to Two, saying, "We are here." Seconds later, Two dies; Six and her Cêpan flee for fear of being caught. Four also reveals that his Cêpan Henri saw the post and tried to hack into the computer to delete the message and save Two, but he was too late. The post is deleted after Two is killed; they assume the Mogadorians deleted it.

In the Fallen Legacies, it is revealed that Adamus Sutekh, a young Mogadorian boy who tried to help the Loric, deleted the Two's post to save the other Loric who might respond. When Two learns that Adamus is a Mogadorian, she does not attack him because she believes he is there to help her. Adamus' brother, Ivanick finds Two and Adamus, killing Two by stabbing her in the throat with a dagger.

Two was too young to have developed any Legacies except for her enhancements. Her Legacies include:

- Enhancement – All Garde possess enhanced physical strength, speed, reflexes, endurance, and durability.

=== Number Three ===
Number Three, or Hannu, is a fourteen-year-old Loric boy and the youngest Loric sent to Earth. He appears at the beginning of the first book when he is hunted by the Mogadorians in Kenya. In The Fallen Legacies, it is revealed that Three was found when someone noticed the scars on his ankle. In I Am Number Four, Four says that Three was off the grid when the Mogadorian found him. Three and his Cêpan are killed when the Mogadorians ambush their shack in the middle of the night. His Cêpan is killed when he investigates a strange noise. Three escapes from the shack and runs at an incredible speed. He leaps over a cliff and onto the other side, but the Mogadorian General is waiting there. The General chokes and then stabs Three in the chest. Three is defiant until the end, telling the General he will never win. In The Fallen Legacies, it is revealed that Ivanick is the one who saw Three's scars, leading the General to him.

Three's Legacies include:

- Enhancement – All Garde possess enhanced physical strength, speed, reflexes, endurance, and durability. Three may also have had enhanced agility.
- Telekinesis – He may have inherited Telekinesis like all the other Garde or he might still be too young.

=== Number Four ===
Number Four, or John Smith, is a sixteen-year-old boy described as fit and attractive with dark blond hair. He has four circular scars on his right ankle, symbolizing the three dead Lorien children and the pendant all the Lorien children wear, signifying the charm that protects them. He is the strongest of the Lorien sent to Earth and has a chimæra named Bernie Kosar. In I am Number Four, Four falls in love with high school junior Sarah Hart. He also has a friend named Samuel Goode who travels with him to search for his father whom he believes to be a prisoner of the Mogadorians. His Cêpan is Henri, who dies at the end of the first book.

In The Power of Six, Four develops feelings for number Six, although these subside in the third book when his feelings for Sarah take over. At the end of the book, Four and Nine go north in an attempt to find Six. It is revealed in The Rise of Nine that he may be the Garde who inherits Pittacus Lore's powers. In The Fall of Five, Four locates Five. After Five takes all the other Garde to Florida, Four dreams of a future where the Mogadorians rule Earth with Ten (as Setrákus Ra's successor) and Five. As Four awakes, the Mogadorians attack and capture Ten. After the fight, Four meets the Adamus, the rouge Mongadorian haunted by One and the son of the General.

In The Revenge of Seven, Four leads Adamus, Samuel, Malcolm, and the Chimera to attack Ashwood Estates, the Mongardorian base on Earth. Four fights the General and is saved from death when Adamus kills his father. Four, Samuel, and Nine go to New York City to intercept a rogue senator. Four uses his healing power to save the senator and to get him to expose the Mogadorian leader, Setrákus Ra. Four and Nine arrive at Setrákus Ra's presentation and reveal that he is a Lorien. However, Four prevents federal agents from hurting Setrákus Ra after learning that doing so will harm Ten. Four does not rescue Ten but is spared by Setrákus Ra in return. Later, Four and Samuel try to make their way out of New York City. Piken almost kills Four, but Samuel saves him with his newly developed telekinesis Legacy.

Four's Legacies include:

- Anima – The ability to communicate with animals. Although technically his first legacy, he discovered this Legacy later, near the end of book one.
- Lumen – The ability to produce fire, heat, and light from the user's hands. Also, resistance to heat, fire, and burning. This is his second Legacy. Four's grandfather had this power. In later books, he can create fireballs.
- Telekinesis – The ability to move objects with one's mind. All Garde have this Legacy, but it takes Four longer than average for his to develop.
- Ximic – Four's third Legacy. This is the rarest and most powerful Legacy, only associated with the Loric Elder, Pittacus Lore. It allows him to copy every Legacy he has felt and seen.
- Enhancement – All Garde possess enhanced physical strength, speed, reflexes, endurance, and durability.

Four's Phoenix Stone is:

- Brittle Leaves Tied with Twine – In The Fall of Five, this Phoenix Stone is found in Four's chest. When Four touches it, a breeze from Lorien fills the room. He says, "This is a reminder of what we fight for."

=== Number Five ===
In Rise of Nine, Five is seen by Six in a fantasy that she creates while in an abandoned grocery store in New Mexico. In The Fall of Five, Five is found after burning his symbol into a cornfield. After reuniting with the Garde, he tells them he buried his Chest on an island in the Florida Everglades. Five travels with Six, Seven, Eight, and Nine to Florida to retrieve his chest. Once there, Five reveals himself as a traitor, working with the Mogadorians since his Cêpan died of a disease. Five attempts to kill Nine but kills Eight by stabbing him through the heart. Seven then attacks Five and takes out his eye.

In Five's Legacy, he is thirteen years old with a skinny build and long hair. He lives on an island with Albert (Rey) and develops the power of Telekinesis. When Rey dies, Five sets sail for Martinique, but he ends up flying to South Beach, Florida. He meets a girl named Emma and they work together as pickpockets. Eventually, they meet a Mogadorian ally named Ethan. Ethan befriends Five who is using the alias Cody. When a job in a warehouse fails, Five uses his Telekinesis to attack Emma's brother and a few other men. Emma knocks Five out with a pipe and he is then cared for by Ethan. Five and Ethan spend the next year living in a luxurious mansion. One day, Five discovers that Ethan is working with the Mogadorians. Ethan reveals that Nine is in custody. Five goes to an FBI building with Ethan the next day. He meets a Mogadorian who gives him a folder with the picture of the person he must kill to join the Mogadorians.

In Five's Betrayal, the Mogadorians promise Five greatness as the ruler of North America and the "Right Hand of the Beloved Leader". The Mogadorians tell him to kill Emma as a test; although he fails to kill Emma, he passes the test because he decides to use her brother instead. When Ethan is believed to have helped in Nine's escape, Setrákus Ra orders Five to kill Ethan to prove himself. After killing Ethan, Five makes preparations to infiltrate the Garde. He finds a letter from Ethan stating that he's probably already dead because he is no longer helpful, but that Five should continue to live, putting himself first before anybody else. At the end of the book, Five plans to get the other Garde to join the Mogadorians, except for Nine whom he holds a personal vendetta against since his escape caused Ethan's death. Five is regarded as the Mogadorians' "most valuable asset", their secret weapon, and the Right Hand of Setrákus Ra.

In The Revenge of Seven, Five is upset over Eight's death. Although Six, Seven, and Nine are invisible, Five somehow knows they are there and apologizes. He lets them take Eight's body. Five arrives on the spaceship the Anubis with Setrakus Ra and Ten, who is now engaged to him. Five is used to test Ten's Dreynen Legacy power. Before arriving in New York City, Five tries to escape with Ten. However, Ra intercepts him, dubbing him his greatest and last mistake. During the ensuing fight, Five uses his Externa without his two balls, revealing that his previously empty eye socket is now being used as a storage space. When Ten's Telekinesis almost throws Ra off the spaceship, Five stabs him in the shoulder. However, Ra transfers his injuries to Emma. Ra grabs, beats, and hurls Five off the Flagship. Five recovers and fights Nine at the end of Revenge of Seven.

In United as One, Five teaches Four how to use his Ximic to copy Five's flying. He also slowly tortures Phili-Dun-Ra, rather than killing her. Four and Seven figure out Five escaped because of a YouTube video. He is last seen on an abandoned island.

Five's Legacies include:

- Avex – Ability to fly.
- Externa – Property absorption or the ability to take on the qualities of whatever he is touching.
- Telekinesis – Like all Garde, Five can move objects with his mind. Compared to the rest of the Garde, his Telekinesis appears to be the strongest.
- Enhancement – All Garde possess enhanced physical strength, speed, reflexes, endurance, and durability.

=== Number Six ===
Number Six, or Maren Elizabeth, is 16 years old. In I Am Number Four: The Lost Files: Six's Legacy, her Cêpan Katarina calls Six a warrior. Of the ten Garde on Earth, she is the most developed in battle techniques and military strategies. Apart from Four, she is the only other Lorien child in I Am Number Four.

Six is described as beautiful, with long black hair, olive-toned skin, hazel-blue-green eyes, high cheekbones, and a wide mouth. She is two inches shorter than Four. In The Rise of Nine preview, she bleaches her hair blonde. Her Cêpan, Katarina, dies three years before the novel begins. Four and Samuel like her romantically, although she chooses Samuel when talking with Sarah in The Rise Of Nine.

In The Rise of Nine, Six and the others try to teleport to New Mexico but are separated. Stuck in New Mexico, Six is captured. At an underground base controlled by Mogadorians and the FBI, she is forced to fight Setrakus Ra and is defeated. During her confrontation with Ra, he transforms into her and has Six pinned up on the wall covered in black rock. After the Garde hurt Ra, Six escapes her prison and reunites with her friends, swearing to kill Ra the next time they see him.

In The Revenge of Seven, Six keeps Seven and Nine on a tight leash, as they are filled with rage following what happened to Eight. Later on, Six and Samuel become romantically involved. Six, Seven, and Adamus take Eight's body to the Mayan temple, Calakmul. At the end of The Fate of Ten, Six faces off with Ra at the temple, thrusting a sharp metal pole into his body using Telekinesis. Ra survives only to be cut down by her in United as One.

Her Legacies include:

- Novis – The ability to turn herself and anything she touches invisible. It was her first Legacy and developed in a Mogadorian dungeon, which she used to escape.
- Sturma – The ability to manipulate the four elements: fire, water, earth, and air. She channels this Legacy to control the weather, including air pressure, strength, and velocity.
- Accelerated Healing- The ability to heal your body at a rapid rate, first discovered in The Rise of Nine while being held captured by Setrakus Ra.
- Telekinesis – Like all Garde, Six can move objects with her mind.
- Enhancement – All Garde possess enhanced physical strength, speed, reflexes, endurance, and durability.

=== Number Seven ===
Number Seven, or Marina, is almost eighteen years old and is the oldest of the Lorien children sent to Earth. She is described as tall with a lean build, long dark hair, and solemn, thoughtful eyes. She and Adelina, her Cêpan, have lived in the Santa Teresa convent in Spain for ten years. Before that, they traveled and hid around Europe, using names such as Genevieve and Brigitte. In The Power of Six, Seven becomes best friends with seven-year-old Ten at the monastery. The Mogadorians located her long ago, but due to the number order, she could not be attacked until the charm was broken or One through Six were killed.

Seven suspects Four is a Garde when she reads about the Paradise High School explosion. When she is attacked by Mogadorians, Ten and Crayton reveal themselves as Loric. Seven, Six, Ten, and Crayton try to find the other Garde members and their Chimaeras before traveling to the United States to find Four and Nine.

In The Rise of Nine, the group travels to the Himalayas and finds Eight. Seven finds Eight attractive and ends up having feelings for him. They discover a cave of drawings that reveal past and future events, one of which shows Eight being stabbed in the chest. After the Mogadorians ambush and kill Crayton, Eight uses his teleporting ability to escape but ends up separating from Six in the process. Later, Seven saves Eight from death and shares a kiss with him.

In The Fall of Five, Seven and Eight develop romantic feelings for each other. They join Five, Six, and Nine to recover Five's Chest in Florida. However, Five reveals his true colors, trying to kill Six and Nine but inviting Seven and Eight to join him. After Eight sacrifices himself for Nine, Seven becomes enraged at Five and discovers her new Cryokenisis Legacy, taking Five's eye in the process. In The Revenge of Seven, Seven desires revenge for Eight's death. She takes Eight's body to the Mayan temple, Calakmul. She begins the process of restarting Lorien, which in turn, appears to resurrect Eight. Eight and Seven share a kiss, but his body then dissolves into light. Seven falls into despair.

Seven's known Legacies include:

- Recupero – The ability to heal any living being, either sickness or wounds, including herself. She heals Héctor's mother of a degenerative and incurable disease. When she uses this power, an icy cold sensation runs through her fingers and body.
- Noxen – She has the power to see in the dark.
- Submari – She discovered she could breathe underwater when she almost drowned in a lake.
- Glacen – The ability to manipulate, create and control ice. In The Fall of Five, Seven radiates cold, making Five shiver and his tears freeze. She used this Legacy against Five after he killed Eight by making large icicles shoot out of the ground. In The Fate of Ten, she turns the rain created by Six into hail and slams them into the Mogadorians.
- Telekinesis – Like all Garde, Seven can move objects with her mind.
- Enhancement – All Garde possess enhanced physical strength, speed, reflexes, endurance, and durability. Like Nine, her speed is greater than that of most Gardes. She can run as fast as a speeding car.

Seven's Phoenix Stones is:

- Liquid Loralite – In Seven's chest, there is a vial of water. When she touches the side of the vial, it glows blue and follows her finger along the glass. When she pours a drop onto her palm, it instantly solidifies into a Loralite stone.

=== Number Eight ===
Number Eight, or Joseph, is a boy living in the Himalayas of northern India. He has developed powers, such as heightened intuition and Telekinesis, but had to learn how to control them by himself because his Cêpan died. Eight is one of the most powerful Loric. He has deep emerald green eyes with long, black, curly hair. Locals think he is the Hindu god Vishnu reincarnated, apparently because he can change his appearance into that of beasts and other beings. The character Crayton speculates that Eight could be the one who inherits Pittacus Lore's powers and can kill Setrakus Ra.

In The Fall of Five, Eight goes with Five, Six, Seven, and Nine to retrieve Five's chest. After Five is revealed to be a traitor, a fight ensues. Eight teleports to protect Nine from Five's attack but is stabbed in the heart and dies, fulfilling a prophecy. When she cannot heal Eight, Seven encases his body in a solid block of ice. Eight s the only member of the Garde to die out of numerical order.

In The Revenge of Seven, Eight's body is preserved by the Mogadorians for delivery to Setrakus Ra. However, Five allows Six, Seven, and Nine to take the body instead. Seven takes his body to the Mayan Temple, Calakmul, for a proper burial. When the team begins to restart Lorien, Eight appears to be resurrected. Eight and Seven share a kiss, but Eight dissolves into light.

Eight's Legacies are:

- Teleportation – Eight can move to a different location instantly.
- Pondus – the ability to walk or run on water.
- Morfen – the ability to shape-shift.
- Telekinesis – Like all Garde, the ability to move objects with one's mind.
- Enhancement – All Garde possess enhanced physical strength, speed, reflexes, endurance, and durability.
- Precognition – the ability to see different possible future outcomes.

Eight's Phoenix Stones is:

- Curved Antler – Eight's chest holds the Curved Antler that acts as a totem. In The Fall of Five, Bernie Kosar goes crazy when he is around the antler, saying he was "calling the others". It also attracts the other Chimaera.

=== Number Nine ===
Nine is roughly the same age as Four and is the second strongest of the ten Lorien children sent to Earth. In The Power of Six, Four rescues him from a Mogadorian base in West Virginia for a year. Nine is described as very attractive, taller than Four, and muscular, with curly, dark hair. He uses a pipe staff and is also very knowledgeable about the inheritance his chest contains. Displaying hints of an aggressive nature and a thirst for revenge, Nine operates with a ferocity that Four did not know the Loric possessed.

In The Lost Files: Nine's Legacy, it is revealed that when Nine and his Cêpan, Sandor, first arrived on Earth, they moved frequently and stayed in small motels but were always found by the Mogadorians. Sandor decides to use the jewels they brought from Lorien to live in luxury and hide in plain sight. Nine and Sandor live in Chicago in a penthouse suite at the top of the John Hancock Center. Nine trains almost non-stop as he does not go to school. He falls in love with a girl named Maddy. Maddy reciprocates his love but is working for the Mogadorians. Using Maddy, the Mogadorians capture Nine and torture Sandor to get him to talk. Nine eventually breaks through the force field barrier and steals a Mogadorian dagger. With Sandor's urging, Nine kills his Cêpan.

In The Power of Six, Nine escapes when Four and Samuel break into the base and free him. In The Rise of Nine, Nine and Four work together, taking shelter at Nine's safehouse in Chicago. Later, they travel to a secret base in New Mexico. At the end of the book, Nine fights Setrakus Ra and meets the entire Garde.

In The Fall of Five, Nine and Five do not get along. Nine views Five as a fat bot or hobbit-thing. After Five reveals his betrayal, Nine becomes enraged and wants revenge. Later, in The Revenge of Seven, Nine follows Four, Samuel, and Agent Walker to New York City to expose Setrakus Ra. Nine is last seen fighting Five during the Mog Siege in New York City.

Nine's known Legacies include:

- Antigravity – Nine can walk on all surfaces, including walls and ceilings, as if upright.
- Anima – The ability to communicate with animals. He discovered this at the end of The Power of Six.
- Miras – Nine can temporarily share his powers or the ability of one of his chest items.
- Accelix – Nine can run faster than the average Loric or human.
- Audis – Super hearing
- Fortem – Nine is stronger than the average Loric or human.
- Telekinesis – Like all Garde, Nine can move objects with his mind.
- Enhancement – All Garde possess enhanced physical strength, speed, reflexes, endurance, and durability. His speed is greater than the other Garde; he can move as a blur, faster than Seven.

Nine's Phoenix Stones are:

- Leather Pouch – In Nine's chest, there is a Leather Pouch containing rich, brown soil. Not much else is known about this item.

=== Number Ten ===
Ten, also known as Ella, is 12 years old. Despite her young age, she has already displayed signs of enhancement in being unusually agile, quick, and athletic. She has an unofficial Cêpan, Crayton, as she was too young to be assigned one when the Mogadorian invaded the planet Lorien. In The Power of Six, Ten appears as a 7-year-old at an orphanage and befriends Seven. She helps Seven find her chest. Later, Ten and Crayton reveal themselves as Loric to Seven. They defeat the Mogadorians with the help of Six. The book ends with Ten, Six, Seven, and Crayton planning to find the other Garde members and their Chimaeras.

In The Rise of Nine, Ten, Crayton, Seven, and Six find Eight in the Himalayas. Crayton dies after an ambush from the Mogadorians, and the group is separated after Eight teleports them away. Ten grieves the death of her Cêpan. Later, Ten rejoins the others fight Setrakus Ra. The book ends with Ra escaping. The Garde promise to finish him off in the future.

In The Fall of Five, Ten has nightmares about Setrákus Ra who tells her to hold his hand, showing her the death of the Garde and humans at her hands. When she reads a letter written by Crayton before he died, she learns that her father, Raylan, was a very rich man who began to resent the Elders because he felt it was his birthright to be one. He became a recluse and had many Chimaera for company. He donated a fuel ship to the museum, but when the invasion came, he took Ten, Chimaera, and Clayton to the fuel ship. In a dream, Ten learns that she is Setrákus Ra's heir. She is kidnapped by the Mogadorians that do not kill her because they want her to rule with Ra.

In The Revenge of Seven, it is revealed that Ten is Ra's granddaughter and is currently on the Anubis, the Mogadorian Flagship, orbiting Earth along with the Mogadorian Fleet. During her time there, Ten reads Ra's book which places a mysterious charm on her. She also learns that her betrothed is Five. Ra allowed Ten to use her Dreynen Legacy on him. Later, when Five tries to help her escape, Ten learns her Legacies cannot be affected by Ra's Dreynen. She learns that the book's charm transfers Ra's injuries to her. During Ra's announcement to Earth, Ten tries to help Four and Nine's intervention. Ra stops her, stating he'll kill her for her treason.

Ten's known Legacies include:

- Aeternus – the ability to shift between ages, but only those she has already lived through. Only one of the Ten Elders is supposed to have this ability.
- Telepathy – The ability to communicate with other Garde using her mind and to sense others' thoughts.
- Dreynen – The ability to cancel or take away another Garde's Legacies for some time. During the fight with Setrakus Ra, she picked up a broken sword, which then glowed with red energy. She throws it at Setrakus Ra, which nullifies him and restores the Garde's powers.
- Precognition – the ability to see different possible future outcomes. She can also see how probable each scenario is.
- Telekinesis – Like all Garde, Ten can move objects with her mind.
- Enhancement – All Garde possess enhanced physical strength, speed, reflexes, endurance, and durability.

== The Cêpan ==
The Cêpan are former inhabitants of Lorien with no Legacies, resembling normal humans. Each Garde has a Cêpan who hides, protects, and trains their child. They also pass on the knowledge of Lorien and the Legacies.

=== Adelina ===
Adelina is the brown-haired Cêpan of Number Seven. Her original Lorien name is Adel. After wandering through Europe, Adelina and Seven enter the Santa Teresa convent in Spain. Adelina loses faith in their ability to restore Lorien and grows accustomed to the religious life at the convent. She believes that one can save others through religion. As a result, she often tells Seven to "stop believing in fairy tales" and does not train Seven. After a Mogadorian attack, Adelina feels remorse for denying Seven's heritage and sacrifices herself to help Seven escape. In The Power of Six, she is killed by a Mogadorian who stabs her in the heart.

Adelina makes a very brief appearance in the prequel, The Last Days Of Lorien. Sandor sees her on the space shuttle as they head for Earth. Her nickname is revealed to be Adel.

=== Albert ===
In The Fall of Five, Albert is described as the oldest Cêpan. He dies on an island within his first six months on Earth. His death was caused by a "vile human disease" when Five was thirteen. In Five's Legacy, his real name is revealed to be Rey.

=== Conrad ===
Conrad Hoyle is Number Two's Cêpan. He and his charge were living in Ireland but left for unknown reasons. Conrad kills a Mogadorian scouting troop that burns down their house in the Scottish Highlands. Conrad heads for London, England, and meets Two at a safe house. However, the Mogadorians find his bus and start to attack. Despite Conrad having two submachine guns with him, he is eventually killed.

=== Crayton ===
Crayton becomes Ten's surrogate Cêpan because she was too young to have an official Cêpan when Lorien was destroyed. The two seem to be close; Ten calls Crayton her Papa. Crayton is very skilled, dedicated, and thorough. When Seven first meets Crayton, she mistakes him for a Mogadorian because he watches her. Seven also misreads Crayton's clue for her–a book with Pittacus in the title. He tries to approach Adelina, but she throws him out once she knows who he is. However, Crayton helps fight the Mogadorians with a briefcase of weapons when Seven leaves Santa Teresa with Hector, Ten, and Six.

In The Rise of Nine, Clayton leads Ten, Six, and Seven to seek the remaining Garde and Chimæras, taking them to India before returning to the United States. Crayton dies from a blast while trying to recover Eight's and Seven's chests. He was the last Cêpan to die. In The Fall of Five, he is referred to as the butler to Ten's family. In the short story, "The Navigator", he refers to himself as a Chimæra keeper.

=== Daxin ===
Daxin is Nine's original Cêpan but did not leave the Lorien Defense Academy and go with Nine to Earth because Sandor steals his identification. Daxin dies during the invasion, with Sandor taking his place as Nine's Cêpan.

=== Henri ===
Henri is the Cêpan of Number Four. His original (changed when he arrived on Earth) Lorien name was Brandon. He worked at the Lorien Defense Academy. With his wife Julianne, he had a child, but he left them to protect Four. Henri is like a father to Four, training and teaching him. Henri dies at the end of the first book while protecting Four from the Mogadorians. In the prequel, The Last Days of Lorien, Henri recruits Sandor to attend the Lorien Defense Academy. At the end of the book, he helps the Cêpans and the Garde escape Lorien as it is being invaded by the Mogadorians. He chooses Sandor to be Nine's Cêpan. He also trains Nine and Four while Sandor goes through training to be a Cêpan.

=== Hilde ===
Hilde is the Cêpan of Number One. Her original Lorien's name is Hessu. One describes Hilde as a mother to her. She is in her fifties and always is strict. After One is arrested for shoplifting, Hilde decides to leave the United States, taking her charge to Malaysia. She is a good martial artist but is quickly overwhelmed by the Mogadorian that shoots her in the chest. Her death allows One to awaken her earthquake abilities. Hilde's last words to One are to run and survive. The Mogadorians leave her body to rot in Malaysia.

Hilde makes a small appearance in The Last Days Of Lorien. She grieves over Lorien's destruction and questions whether they will survive on Earth. She is comforted by Sandor after saying that they are all going to die and that it is useless to hide.

=== Katarina ===
Katarina is Number Six's Cêpan. She is more cool-headed than Six and tries to temper her volatile Garde. According to Six, Katarina was very thorough with forgeries and training. She also had multiple lovers back on Lorien. When Six was thirteen, the Mogadorians caught them, torturing and killing Katarina in an attempt to force Six to provide information.

=== Reynolds ===
At the mention of his Cêpan Reynolds, Eight becomes withdrawn and avoids the topic, indicating that his Cêpan is dead. Reynolds and Eight were betrayed to the Mogadorians by Reynolds's girlfriend on Earth, Lola.

=== Sandor ===
In The Power of Six, Nine says that his Cêpan, Sandor, was killed. Sandor is young for a Cêpan and works with older Loric engineers. In The Lost Files: Nine's Legacy, Sando creates drones and other machines that Nine fights in their practice gym. Sandor also invents a Mogadorian tracker covered with an iPod Touch case called an "iMog". His favorite comic book hero is Batman; he also loves the James Bond series and identifies with the character. After Nine and Sandor are caught and imprisoned, Nine mercy-kills Sandor to save him from torture.

Sandor is the main character of the prequel The Last Days Of Lorien which explores his youth on the planet Lorien. Sandor is forced to attend the Lorien Defense Academy for some wrongdoings with his engineering skills. He meets several key players in the future books, including Brandon/Henri, Hessu, Adelina, John/Four, and Stanley/Nine. Sandor also meets a Garde named Devektra, who is famous for her music and dancing. It is implied that he has feelings for her. The story ends with Sandor saving Nine during the invasion of Lorien and becoming his Cêpan.

=== Three's Cêpan ===
The Cêpan of Number Three was killed in Kenya by a sword that was pushed through their door. He was said to be in his fifties. He might be Kentra, mentioned in The Last Days of Lorien.

== The Mogadorians ==
The Mogadorians or Mogs are the main antagonists of the series. Mogadorians are aliens from the planet of Mogadore. They set out to conquer Lorien because their planet is dying from a lack of resources. The Mogs follow the teachings of Setrakus Ra through his Great Book, which commands violence and respect for the strong. They often say "By Ra" concerning their leader. The planet Mogadore is twice the size of Lorien and around a fifth of Earth's size. They hunt the Garde out of fear. They plan on conquering the Earth after destroying the Garde. In the meantime, the Mogs gain power in the United States government.

The Mogadorian soldiers and scouts have pale white skin, black eyes, and serrated teeth. They are vat-born clones made by Setrakus Ra and his scientists. They are stronger and faster but not smarter than Trueborn Mogs. Trueborn Mogadorians are identical in appearance to humans. They are gregarious and like cities and crowded places. The Mogadorians have difficulties conceiving children; if a child is born, the mothers often die in childbirth.

=== Setrákus Ra ===
Setrákus Ra is a Lorien who becomes the leader of The Mogadorians. He arrives on Earth at the end of The Power of Six. Ra is 7 feet tall but becomes 20 feet tall when using his growth Legacy. He is tanned with short hair and a chiseled jaw. There is a "purplish scar" around his throat, given to him by Pittacus Lore. Because Setrákus Ra had been his best friend, Pittacus banished him from Lorien instead of going through with the scheduled execution.

Ra is the author of the Great Book, which the Mogs follow faithfully. It is about war and how to conquer and consume everything in their path. During Six's fight with him, she noticed Ra had unique scars around his ankles, possibly hinting that Ra may be one of the original Ten Elders. In that fight, Ra uses his shapeshifting Legacy to mirror her features, which fools the Garde when they come to her rescue. In The Fall of Five, Ra reveals that Ten is his heir and comes from a prominent family connected to the Elders. This most likely means that Setrakus Ra is the tenth Elder who "died" in the Secret Wars.

In The Revenge of Seven, Ra tells Ten that she is his granddaughter while aboard the Anubis, the Mog Flagship orbiting Earth. Later, Ra confesses he is the tenth Elder believed to have died in the Secret Wars, saying that the other Elders did not agree with his plans for the future of Lorien, and he was banished. He then changed his Loric genetic code to look like a Mogadorian, eventually gaining their trust and position of power. Ten describes Ra's face as an old Loric architectural ruin being rebuilt by a gross Mog. Ra places a mysterious charm on Ten and plans on her marrying Five. However, his plans change when Five tries to sneak Ten off the Flagship.

Ra's Legacy Dreynen power does not work on Ten. However, the charm he places on Ten causes any injury inflicted on him to be transferred to her. The exception is if she is the one to hurt him. After throwing Five off the Flagship and healing Ten, Ra begins his presentation on Earth's Surrender. However, Four and Nine exposed him for what he is, a monster. When Ten helps the Garde, Ra grabs her and intends to execute her for treason. Four prevents anyone from harming Ra after learning about the charm on Ten. Ra then spares Four in return.

In The Fate of Ten, Ra makes a broadcast, stating that the Garde are alien terrorists. He gives Earth 48 hours to surrender. After learning the Sanctuary is no longer protected, Ra takes the Flagship Anubis toward it and fires a powerful cannon that destroys the temple. During this time, he has a black ooze pumped into Ten's body to control her. Six impales Ra with a pipe he was using to harvest the Loric energy underneath Sanctuary, severely wounding Ra and forcing him to flee. In United As One, Ra is seen in a vision, healing himself in a pool of the black ooze he used to control Ten. While Ra heals, the Mog commanders fight over the lack of orders and their desire to become the next leader. The Garde take advantage of the discord in the Mog Fleet and capture a warship.

Once healed, Ra regains command of the Mog fleet and orders it to bomb Earth's major cities. It is revealed that during his healing process, he corrupted Loric energy, seen as the black ooze, from Sanctuary and gained the ability to bestow Legacies on other Trueborn Mogs. During the attack on his main base in West Virginia, he faces Four, Five, Seven, and Nine but defeats them due to his bonding with the corrupted Loric energy. Four attempts to stab Ra with a dagger made of Voron. However, the black ooze continually healed any wounds inflicted. When Nine strikes him in the chest with the Voron dagger, the black ooze absorbs it. While Seven attempts to heal Nine's injury, Ra grabs her hand, causing him to retreat in pain. Realizing that the only way to injure him was to use the Legacy of Recupero, Four takes him on in a one-on-one showdown and uses his Recupero to heal Ra of the black ooze and his augmented abilities, restoring Ra to his original elderly Loric body. Six makes her way down to the pool of black ooze and finds Four and Ra both barely alive and Ra attempting to get back into the pool. Six grabs the Voron dagger and tells him, "This is what progress looks like." as she decapitates Ra. Following their leader's death, many of the Trueborn Mogs surrender and, a year later, a number of them reject Ra's teachings completely and burn his holy book.

Ra's Legacies include:

- Aeternus – Ra can extend his lifespan by returning to the ages he has already lived. This is revealed in The Revenge of Seven.
- Enhancement – All Garde possess enhanced physical strength, speed, reflexes, endurance, and durability.
- Telekinesis – All Garde can move objects with the mind.
- Dreynen – Ra can cancel the Garde's Legacies.
- Charm Casting – This is a learned ability rather than an actual Legacy.

Personal Weapons:

- Golden Staff (Eye of Thaloc) – Ra carries a golden staff with a hammerhead and a black eye. When the eye glows red, it can rip a person to shreds. When it glows purple, the staff helps Ra with his shapeshifting powers. If the staff touches another person, it causes a numbing sensation throughout the body, as if drained of blood. In The Revenge of Seven, the staff is broken by Nine.
- Fire Whip – With each of Ra's swings, the Fire Whip unleashes a wave of fire. When it hits someone, the injury turns black and slowly spreads throughout the person's body, encasing them in black rock. In The Revenge of Seven, the whip can separate into three whip ends.

=== Adamus Sutekh ===
Adamus Sutekh, also known as Adam, is The General's twenty-year-old son and narrator of the Fallen Legacies. Originally possessed of bloodlust like the rest of his kind, Adamus changes after he witnesses One's death and enters One's memories. He comes to see how evil his father and his kind are. It is hinted that Adamus has a crush on One. After a three-year coma from the memory infiltration, he learns of a second Garde captured in London and decides to help Two escape.

Later, Adamus and his brother Ivanick are sent with the General to find Three in Kenya. Adamus tries to help Three and tips him off of the Mogadorian presence. Ivanick, believing Adam is trying to take a chance at the glory, stops him. Adamus tries to convince Ivanick to change sides but is branded a traitor. He manages to defeat Ivanick using moves he learns from One's memories. While Adamus watches the General kill Three, Ivanick sneaks up from behind and pushes Adamus into the ravine. Adamus awakens on a beach in California with One desperately trying to bring him back into the real world and prevent him from dying.

In The Search For Sam, it is revealed that Adamus survives his fall in the ravine. He is rescued by a local and mistaken for a volunteer. He spends a few months volunteering but returns to Ashwood when One tells him she is fading away. Once back in Ashwood, only his mother greets him with love, while the General and his sister Kelly treat him like a hostile. He makes a deal with his father to become useful in a week or face execution. He is assigned to surveyor work and meets Dr. Zarkos who has improved the mind transfer technology. Seeing this as a perfect opportunity, Adamus creates a ruse that makes his father give him to Zarkos as a lab rat.

Adamus wounds the doctor and awakens Malcolm Good who oversees the experiment. During his dream-like state, Adamus lets out a massive shockwave that causes an implosion inside the underground complex. One transfers her powers to him and reveals that there is no way to save her. Her goal was to convince Adamus that the Mogadorians are evil and that he needs to find the Garde. Adamus declares his love for One and they kiss before she disappears forever. He awakens with Malcolm Goode by his side; they band together to survive.

Over time, Malcolm becomes Adamus' mentor. They return to Paradise, Ohio, and learn that Samuel has joined the Loric cause and left with the Garde. Adamus suggests that they go to a secret government base in New Mexico. Sneaking into the government base, they find Samuel and set him free. Adamus sacrifices himself so Malcolm and Samuel can escape, battling several Mogadorians and Ivanick. Using his newfound Legacy, Adamus kills Ivanick and a few Mogadorians by causing an earthquake. The book ends with Adamus pledging to survive and join the rest of the Garde.

In The Forgotten Ones, Adamus survives the collapse of the underground base by using his earthshaking powers to escape the rubble. He discovers a young Mogadorian commander named Rexicus Saturnus or Rex. Needing information and a prisoner, he helps Rexicus to the surface and finds shelter. Adamus also meets a Chimaera whom he names Dust. The two form a quick bond with each other. After a few days, he feels a bond with Rexicus, who knows who Adamus is and wants to kill him.

Through Rexicus, Adamus learns that the Mogs were experimenting on Samuel, trying to obtain the Chimaera shapeshifting gene to add to their Vat-Born soldiers. When Rexicus reveals that the Chimaeras are at the research facility in Palm Island, New York, Adamus forces Rexicus to lead him there. As they journey across the country, Rexicus and Adamus grow closer together. Near Palm Island, Adamus is attacked by Mogs and believes that Rexicus has betrayed him. With the help of his powers and Dust, he manages to defeat them but is knocked out by one last surviving Mog and is saved by Dust. Waking up in a stolen car, Adamus learns that Rexicus saved him and never betrayed him, although he did hide from the fight. When Adamus asks why he is helping him, Rexicus replies that he does not know, other than his promise to Adamus as and he still believes in the Mog's cause.

Adamus enters Palm Island, disguised as a prisoner. Rexicus breaks him out and takes him to the Chimaeras. Adamus escapes with the Chimaeras and Dust, while Rexicus stays behind to rejoin his fellow Mogadorians. Adamus, Dust, and the Chimeras drive to Chicago. When Adamus arrives in Chicago, the fight is over and the Mogs are all gone. Four mistakes him for a soldier and is about to kill him when Adamus introduces himself. Four is suspicious but tells Adamus that he will help win the war.

In The Revenge of Seven, Adamus leads Four, Samuel, and Malcolm to Ashwood Estates to take out the Trueborn Mogs. However, the Trueborn are all gone, except for a salvage team and the General. After a fight, Adamus saves Four from the General by stabbing his father in the back with his father's sword. He meets the other Garde and slowly grows on them. He later joins Six and Seven on the journey to the Mayan Temple, Calakmul. After taking out the Mog forces, he can pass through the Lorien force field and follow the Garde into the Temple.

In United as One, Adamus and Six have a run-in with Phiri Dun-Ra. Adamus falls into a chasm while fighting Phiri, pulling Phiri down with him. Dust flies into the chasm and pulls Adamus out, but dies in the process.

Adamus' Legacies include:

- Terric – The ability to cause tremors and earthquakes, Adamus inherited this Legacy from One

=== Andrakkus Sutekh ===
Andrakkus Sutekh, also known as The General or Andrew Sutton, is the commander of the Mogadorian Forces. He is a strict and fierce individual. His family includes his wife, son Adamus, daughter Kelly, and adopted son Ivanick. His main base of operations is Ashwood Estates in Washington. He raises Adamus and Ivanick as brothers but considers Ivanick his favorite. After the death of One, he permits Adamus to be used in an experiment to infiltrate her mind. It is revealed in The Fallen Legacies that the General killed Three. The General's fate is unknown at the end of The Search for Samuel when Adamus destroys most of Ashwood Estates. However, in The Forgotten Ones, it is revealed that the General is alive.

In the film adaptation of I Am Number Four, he is called the Mogadorian Commander.

=== Commander Deltoch ===
Deltoch is the Commanding Officer of the Mogadorian Base in Virginia, where Nine is held captive. He orders Five to kill Nine. He also arranges for Five to kill Emma due to their past relationship. Deltoch and Ethan do not agree on how to prepare Five. He also does not agree with the human-like Ethan having a high position among the Mogs. After Five kills Ethan, Deltoch appears and salutes him, signifying Five proved himself and is now a commander. In The Revenge of Seven, Five kills Deltoch.

=== General Rahn ===
One of the leading commanders of the Mogadorian invasion.

=== Ivanick Shu-Ra ===
Ivanick, or Ivan, is the adopted son of The General and best friend turned rival of Adamus. He was the son of a fierce Mogadorian warrior named Bolog Shu-Ra who died in a battle on Lorien. At the beginning of I Am Number Four: The Lost Files: The Fallen Legacies, Ivanick and Adamus study and train together. Over the years, Ivanick becomes competitive and wants to prove to the General that he is better and stronger than Adamus. When One is killed, he exclaims, "That was awesome!"

After Adamus awakes from his three-year coma, Ivanick travels with him to London to find Two. Ivan kills Two, thinking Adamus does not have the stomach for it. Later, the two travel to Kenya to find Three. Ivan stops Adamus from warning Three, at first thinking he was trying to beat him for the kill, but then discovers Adamus's betrayal and brands him a traitor. He fights Adamus, resulting in Adamus knocking Ivanick out. Later, he pushes Adamus into the ravine.

In the I Am Number Four: Lost Files: The Search for Samuel, it is revealed that the General and Ivanick cover up Adamus' betrayal, making it look like he died at the hands of Three. Ivanick is promoted and stationed at the government base in New Mexico. There, Ivanick meets with Adamus, who has completely sided with the Garde and now has Legacy powers. A battle emerges, and Adamus causes an earthquake. During the earthquake, rubble beheads Ivanick.

=== Kelly Sutekh ===
Kelly is the daughter of the General and the younger sister of Adamus.

=== Lockam Anu ===
Lockam Anu was a Mogadorian doctor who creates a machine that allows the user to see a dead Garde's memories. Adamus is the first to use this machine. When Adamus does not wake from the machine-induced comma, Dr. Anu is killed by the General. Adamus' mother later recalls that the General never liked Anu and was surprised that he wasn't killed earlier.

=== Phiri Dun-Ra ===
Phiri Dun-Ra is a Truborn Mog and one of the few female commanders. Originally stationed at the West Virginia base, she was disgraced when the Loric escaped during her watch. She was given a choice, death or relocation. She chose relocation in hopes of making up for her mistake. Her one goal in life is to prove that she is Setrakus Ra's most devoted and loyal follower. She is relocated to the Sanctuary in Mexico, hoping to break through the force field. There, Adamus and Six's group attack. Later, the Anubis spaceship arrives with Setrakus Ra. After joining the battle, Ra is injured and gives orders to crush the Garde. While Ra is unconscious, Phiri acts as Ra's voice and ears. Due to Ra's injuries, she takes him back to the West Virginia base to recover. After Ra's recovery, he rewards Phiri by making her the first Mogs to have the new enhancements, developed from the human Garde. Phiri's augmentations stem from a tentacle-like appendage. Her "arm" can penetrate other Garde to injure or kill them, temporarily absorbing and disabling their Legacies. However, all of her stolen Legacies are seen to be corrupted in some way.

=== Piken Mog ===
Another Trueborn Augmentation, Piken Mog is described as having the bottom half of a Truborn Mog and the top half of a Piken, with his two halves stitched together. He has incredible strength and speed, and his skin is bulletproof. He kills many of the soldiers in Patience Creek until Daniella kills him by turning him to stone.

=== Rexicus Saturnus ===
Rexicus Saturnus, or Rex, is a young Mogadorian commander who appears in The Forgotten Ones. After the events of The Search for Samuel, Rexicus survives the collapse of the New Mexico underground base and meets up with Adamus, who helps him to the surface and find shelter. During their recovery from the incident, Rexicus realizes who Adamus is and wants to kill him for his betrayal. After he provides information that the Mogs are attempting to harness the Chimæra shapeshifting gene for their Vat-Born soldiers, Rexicus is forced to take Adamus to the research facility in Palm Island, New York. While Rexicus does want to kill Adamus, he also forms a friendship with him. Although he hides during an attack by the Mogs, Rexicus rescues Adamus and takes him to Palm Island. When Adamus asks why he hasn't killed or betrayed him, Rexicus replies that he does not know and that he wants to fulfill his promise. Coming up with a plan, Rexicus pretends Adamus is a prisoner, allowing him to infiltrate the facility. Later, Rexicus breaks Adamus out and they free the Chimæra. After ensuring Adamus's escape, Rexicus stays behind, still believing in the Mog cause and hoping to rejoin his fellow Mogadorians. His fate is left unknown. In United as One, Rexicus betrays the Mogadorians by killing the commander who was about to kill Four. Four nearly kills Rexicus, but Adamus saves him. Rexicus then joins the Loric cause.

=== Shadow Mog ===
Shadow Mog's actual name is never revealed. He is one of the few Trueborns given augmentations. His augmentation allows him to teleport between shadows. It is not an instant teleportation as his legs can be seen dangling somewhere else while his torso is restrained by Four. Samuel kills Shadow Mog by using his technopathy to turn on all the lights, removing any shadows and immediately severing Shadow Mog in half.

=== Thin Mog ===
Thin Mog's real name is never revealed. He can release spores from his mouth that, when inhaled, allow Thin Mog to control all aspects of the victim. Samuel shoots Thin Mog in the head with a blaster, cutting his head in half. Upon dying, spores are released from Thin Mog's head that turns to ash after death.

=== Dr. Zakos ===
Zakos is Dr. Anu's successor as the head scientist of the West Virginia base. He is one of Ra's favorites. He enhances Mog soldiers with Legacies from human Garde.

== Humans ==
=== Agent Purdy ===
Agent Purdy is an FBI agent who collaborates with the Mogadorians. He has Mog enhancements and is tasked with capturing the Garde. He appears to die from a heart attack but is killed by his enhancements.

=== Agent Walker ===
Agent Walker is a redhead female FBI agent tasked with capturing the Garde by the Mogadorians. However, after Agent Purdy dies, she joins the Garde and helps expose Setrakus Ra. She reveals that the Mogadorians came to Earth ten years ago. In exchange for advanced technology and medical enhancements, the FBI allows the Mogadorians to use their resources to track down the Garde. Walker says that about 15% of the United States military, CIA, and FBI are MogPro, along with the Secretary of Defense and the Vice President.

In The Revenge of Seven, Walker, her men, Four, Samuel, and Nine go to New York City to intercept Senator Sanderson, the Secretary of Defense. However, Walker's enhancements turn on him. After Four heals him, Walker takes the group to Setrákus Ra so they can stop his presentation to Earth.

=== Daniela Morales ===
Daniela Morales lives in New York City with her mother and stepfather. When the invasion began, her stepfather helped her to escape from the Mogadorians. As she climbs down the fire escape, an electrifying sensation coursed through her body, signifying that she is bestowed with Legacies. A few minutes later, she meets a pack of Mogs and tries to surrender but accidentally uses Telekinesis on them. Later, she joins Four and Samuel through the ravaged city.

Daniela Legacies are:

- Telekinesis – the ability to move objects with one's mind.
- Petras – Daniela develops the ability to turn living creatures into stone at the end of The Fate of Ten.

=== Devdan ===
Devdan is a friend of Eight who helps him to master his Legacies. He is mentioned in The Rise of Nine. He is captured by the Mogadorians and is used by Setrakus Ra to taunt Eight. Most readers assumed Devdan was Pittacus Lore. However, in The Fall of Five, Malcolm Goode says Pittacus Lore was dead before the invasion of the planet Lorien. The deceased Lore might be another Loric with the Samuele title; new Garde are chosen around every 1,000 years to assume the ten titles.

=== Emily ===
Emily is Sarah's friend in Paradise, who makes a few appearances in I Am Number Four. Emily has a crush on Samuel, who reciprocates her attraction. During a party at Mark's house, Samuel talks to Emily and they kiss. However, their budding relationship is short-lived when Samuel goes on the run with Four and Six as fugitives to the United States government. Despite not being seen in the rest of the series, Emily is mentioned a few times.

=== Emma ===
Emma is a Hispanic girl who became a partner in crime with Five in Five's Legacy. She is described as being deeply tanned with black hair and dark eyes. She is Five's friend and romantic interest. Their friendship is destroyed when Ethan sends Five and Emma for a rigging job; Ethan knows Five is Loric and sets him up. Ethan's henchmen attack Five and Emma, forcing Five to use his Legacies. One of the injured henchmen is Emma's brother. She is shocked and furious at Five, calling him a monster and knocking him out with a pipe. She moves to Tallahassee after her brother gets out of the hospital.

In Five's Betrayal, Emma is brought before Five in Virginia to test him. She is nearly crushed to death by Five's telekinesis after she mentions the word "monster". Five spares her by using her brother. Emma is moved to another location, safe and sound.

=== Ethan ===
Ethan is a Greeter, one of the nine people assigned to help the Loric start their lives on the Earth and show its cultures and way of life. However, he loses faith in the Loric cause and starts working for the Mogadorians. In exchange for his services, the Mogadorians tell Ethan his life will be spared when they take over the Earth. These events are in I Am Number Four: Th Lost Files: The Hidden Enemy. The Mog commander orders Ethan to become Five's best friend and mentor. Ethan gets Five to join the Mogs. However, he considers Five's powers to be a gift. During Nine's escape, Ethan is injured by green lava, destroying half his face and right hand. The Mogs suspect Ethan's involvement in Nine's escape. As a test, Setrakus Ra orders Five to kill Ethan. Five and Ethan had their final moments together in Miami.

Before his death, Ethan leaves a note in Five's box, saying that he is probably dead as his usefulness is up. Ethan instructs Five to do anything to survive, putting himself before everything.

=== Héctor Ricardo ===
Héctor Ricardo is the town drunk of Santa Teresa and Seven's only human friend. Héctor helps Crayton fight the Mogadorians and protect Seven and Ten. He is grateful to Seven for healing his mother and helping her escape the Mogadorians. He is killed by Piken in The Power of Six

=== Lola ===
Lola is a woman who Cêpan Reynolds falls in love with on Earth. Because of her jealousy of Reynolds's Garde Eight, Lola betrayed them to the Mogadorians in exchange for a large bag of gold. However, the Mogadorians stab her in the back as her "bag of gold" explodes.

=== Maddy ===
Maddy is new to town when Nine lives in Chicago. She has long black hair with bangs. She becomes friends with Nine after meeting at the Windy Wall; later, they become a couple. She chooses a planetarium for their first date. On a second date, Mogadorians show up, and Nine participates in a car chase. Nine loses the Mogs, but Maddy gets angry and leaves after Nine kisses her. Later, she accepts his apology. Nine spends the night at her house but does not sleep with her. In the morning, Nine wakes up surrounded by Mogadorians. He tries to escape with Maddy, but she tazes him. It is revealed that Maddy's parents were taken hostage by the Mogadorians two years prior; the Mogadorians will not let Maddy see her parents unless she finds Nine. She is taken to a base in West Virginia and reunites with her parents. The Mogadorians release Piken into the room, killing Maddy and her family. Her last words are begging Nine for help.

=== Malcolm Goode ===
Malcolm Goode is Samuel's father and one of the few people who knows about the Loric. He is said to be a Greeter: one of the nine people assigned to help the Loric start their lives on Earth. In Henri's Letter to Four, he says they went to Paradise, Ohio, looking for Malcolm. Malcolm disappeared, and Samuel believes aliens abducted him. In Search for Samuel, it is revealed that Malcolm was experimented on to extract information about the Loric, causing him to forget who and where he is.

Adamus awakens Malcolm who becomes his mentor. They go to Paradise, Ohio to find Samuel. However, Samuel has joined the Loric cause and left with the Garde. Adamus suggests that they go to a secret government base in New Mexico. Sneaking into the government base, they find Samuel and set him free. Adamus sacrifices himself, so Malcolm and Samuel can escape. Due to his time as a Mog captive, Malcolm is suspected of giving information to the Mogs, but the informant is revealed to be Five. Four allows Ten to be captured to save Malcolm's life at the end of The Fall of Five.

At the beginning of The Revenge of Seven, Malcolm is in an abandoned warehouse with Four, Adamus, Samuel, Bernie Kosar, Dust, Sarah, and the Chimaera rescued from Plum Island. He relocates with the others at Ashwood Estates and stays with the Chimaera.

=== Mark James ===
Mark James is the quarterback of the school football team and a bully. He is bitter when he sees his former girlfriend, Sarah, starting a friendship with Four. After Mark tries to hurt Four and Sarah while they are on a Halloween ride, Four defeats Mark and his friends, warning Mark to stop messing with them. Mark is sufficiently intimidated and a truce is made. Four saves Mark's dogs when his house burns down during a party. Mark discovers a video of Four saving Sarah and his two dogs from the fire and shows it to Henri. He then fights alongside Four against the Mogadorians. In The Power of Six, it is revealed that Mark adamantly denies that Four started the house fire and is willing to take the blame rather than place it on Four.

At the beginning of The Revenge of Seven, Four, Sarah, and others are hiding in an abandoned warehouse. Sarah comes across the website They Walk Among Us which makes positive statements about the Loric heroes and very negative descriptions of the Mogadorians. Sarah finds the editor's username JollyRoger182. She smiles and explains that it was a name used by the Paradise High School quarter-back, suggesting that Mark is the new editor of the next chapters of the book I Am Number Four: The Lost Files: Return To Paradise. In United as One, Mark is brainwashed into exposing the Loric secrets to the Mogadorians but begins resisting and is killed by Phili-Dun-Ra.

=== Samuel Goode ===
Samuel Goode, or Sam, is Four's best friend in I Am Number Four. Samuel is a devoted believer in aliens and alien conspiracies and thinks that aliens abducted his father. He suspects Four is an alien after they are attacked on the Haunted Hayride by Mark and his friends, but is convinced by Four otherwise. However, when he sees Four fight the three men in Athens who write the alien conspiracy magazine, They Walk Among Us, he finds out he was right. He is a gangly kid with glasses, although they are not his. He explains to Four that the glasses belong to his father. He has a crush on Sarah's friend, Emily. During the battle against the Mogadorians, Samuel saves Four's life by killing one of the soldiers. He also saves Six by carrying her back to his truck when she is injured. He decides to accompany Four and Six by the end of the novel.

In The Power of Six, Samuel remains on the run with Four and Six. It is later revealed Samuel's father, Malcolm Goode, knew about the Loric and welcomed the Garde and their Cêpans when they arrived on Earth. Samuel forms feelings for Six, who has feelings for Samuel and Four at the same time. While Six travels to Spain to find Seven, Samuel and Four travel to the Mogadorian's secret headquarters in West Virginia to find Six's and Four's chests. They find Nine and set him free but are discovered by the Mogs. Four loses contact with Samuel while escaping the Mogadorians.

In the Lost Files: The Search for Sam, Samuel is held in a cage at a secret government base in New Mexico. His father and a rogue Mogadorian, Adamus, find him and set him free. Samuel and Malcolm evade the oncoming Mogadorians with the help of Adamus. This happens during the battle against Setrákus Ra, in The Rise of Nine.

In The Fall of Five, Samuel intermittently narrates the novel that explains his capture. The book revisits his escape with Adamus and his father. Samuel and his father catch up on lost time, leave a message for his mother, and reunite with the Garde in Chicago. Samuel asks Six about having a relationship, and she replies that it isn't the right time, leaving him heartbroken. When the Garde leaves to get Five's chest in the Everglades, Samuel stays behind with his father and Sarah. At the end of the novel, Samuel receives a call from Adamus (actually where Lost Files: The Forgotten Ones ends), who warns him of the coming Mogadorian attack. Samuel, Malcolm, and Sarah hold off the Mogs and later escape.

In The Revenge of Seven, Samuel is in an abandoned warehouse with Four, Adamus, Malcolm, Bernie Kosar, Dust, Sarah, and the Chimæra rescued from Plum Island. He follows Four into the Ashwood Estates battle and later into New York City to expose Setrakus Ra. When a Piken almost kills Four, Samuel saves him with his newly developed Telekinesis, granted by the planet Lorien. Samuel is surprised, saying, "did I just do that?".

In United as One, Samuel develops the ability to control electronic devices, using it to take control of a Mogadorian ship. On Four's command, Samuel uses his hijacked ship to destroy the main Mog base. A year later, he is shown to be in a romantic relationship with Six when Four checks up on them.

Samuel's Legacies are:

- Telekinesis – Samuel develops this Legacy after Six, Seven, and Adamus bring the necessary items to the Sanctuary. Lorien talks through Eight, saying those worthy will receive, indicating that humans will get Legacies.
- Nulla – In United as One, Samuel shows the ability to control electronic devices. He practices on an old game boy with no batteries. He manages to turn it on, but when he tries to turn it off, his hovercraft turns off also. In the middle of the book, Samuel turns off the lights in Patience Creek but then turns them back on. Samuel later uses it to make a Mogodorian ship fire on their main base, destroying it.

=== Sarah Hart ===
Sarah Hart is the only person at Four's new school in Ohio, other than Samuel, that offers friendship. Four and Sarah became a couple after the Haunted Hayride in book one. Sarah is portrayed as an intelligent and beautiful teenage girl with straight blond hair just past her shoulders, ivory skin, high cheekbones, and soft blue eyes. Originally a cheerleader, she dated football player Mark James. After her parents realize that Mark is a bad influence, they send her away for the summer. When she returns, she quits the cheerleading squad and breaks up with Mark. She is passionate about photography and animals.

After Four saves her from a house fire, she realizes he is not human; Four is then compelled to tell her the truth. Despite knowing that he is not human, Sarah falls deeply in love with Four and confesses it to him, and he does the same. After the Mogadorians try to kill Four, he leaves her, unwillingly, at the end of I Am Number Four, promising to come back.

In The Power of Six, Sarah appears only once but is still mentioned throughout the book. While passing through Paradise, Four contacts Sarah and they meet in a park. Although they start their meeting with joy, Sarah tells Four to turn himself in and checks her mobile phone several times, though she claims it is just a text from a friend. It soon becomes clear that Sarah is jealous of Four's relationship with Six. They argue, leaving Sarah in tears. The FBI suddenly appears. Sarah is whisked away, and Samuel and Four are arrested. It is implied that Sarah is the one who betrays Four and reveals his presence to the FBI.

In The Rise of Nine, it is explained that Sarah did not betray Four and was captured by the Mogadorians after the FBI took him away. They drugged her and forced her to repeat conversations word for word. She has been held captive by the Mogadorians and meets with Six, who was also captured. Sarah and Six became close friends. Four and Sarah have a brief moment together before they battle Setrakus Ra, who is holding Six captive.

In The Fall of Five, Sarah is still with the group and learns to shoot to protect herself. While Six, Five, Eight, and Nine leave to get Five's Chest, Sarah stays behind with Samuel and his father, Malcolm, to take care of Four, who is in a coma. When the Mogadorians attack their hideout, she helps fight. Sarah is last seen helping Samuel and Malcolm escape, while Four stays behind to find his way out.

At the beginning of The Revenge of Seven, Sarah is in an abandoned warehouse with Four and others. Later, Sarah and Bernie Kosar meet with Mark James to find more information about the Mogadorians. In The Fate of Ten, she goes to the Sanctuary with Mark and Lexa to help Six, Adamus, and Seven fight the Anubis. She is mortally wounded and dies after saying goodbye to Four.

=== Senator Sanderson ===
Senator Sanderson is the United States Secretary of Defense and one of the Mog-Pro traitors. He was supposed to present Setrakus Ra, but his Mog enhancements turn against him. When he is about to die, Four heals him. Afterward, the Senator reveals that the Mog fleet has arrived, with ships hovering over almost every major city in the world.

=== Wade ===
Wade is a surfer around sixteen years old who likes to shoplift. He is rebellious like One and she develops a crush on him. To impress Wade, One shoplifts some records but is caught and arrested by the police. Wade is one of the main reasons One stops training and is found by the Mogadorians.

== The Chimæra ==
Chimæras are from Lorien and have the power to morph into other animals or beasts. All Chimæra, except Bernie Kosar, are the property of Ten's father, Raylan.

=== Bandit ===
Bandit is a Chimæra who shapeshifts into a raccoon and sits next to Regal. Bandit was being experimented on at the Mogadorian facility at Plum Island. Bandit is left at Ashwood Estates to protect Malcolm. In United as One, Bandit is one of the five left behind as a gift to protect the Human Garde known as Nigel.

=== Bernie Kosar ===
Bernie Kosar is a Chimæra who follows and protects Four and Henri since their arrival on Earth. He takes the form of a gecko when Four is in Florida. While Four is in Paradise, Bernie takes the form of a beagle. His name on Lorien was Hadley. In The Rise of Nine, Four realizes that Bernie Kosar is Hadley whom he remembers from Lorien. Bernie helps Four, Samuel, and Six whenever they are in trouble with the police or Mogadorians. In The Rise of Nine, Bernie continues to help Four, along with the newly found Nine, and fights alongside the Garde against Setrakus Ra in New Mexico. Bernie and the others survive Ra and try to find a way out while looking for Samuel. In The Fall of Five, Bernie helps fight the Mogadorians. It is unknown whether he survives or not. In "The Revenge of Seven", it is revealed that Bernie survived, but barely. He was found severely injured; Four heals him, but a piece of his ear was bitten off. Bernie goes with Sarah and Mark James to find more information about the Mogadorians.

=== Biscuit ===
Biscuit is a Chimæra named by Sarah while he is in the form of a playful Golden Retriever. Biscuit is experimented on at the Mogadorian facility at Plum Island. Later, Biscuit is left at Ashwood Estates to protect Malcolm Goode. In United as One, Biscuit is one of the five left behind as a gift to protect the Human Garde known as Daniela.

=== Dust ===
Dust is a Chimæra who was captured in Dulce by the Mogadorians. They use him as a test subject to find a way to get his shapeshifting genes into the Mogs' Vat-Born. Dust finds Adamus and Rexicus in the desert of Dulce. He is friendly with Adamus but has a hatred for Rexicus. Dust travels with the two to Plum Island, where he fights the Mogadorians and helps Adamus free the other Chimæra. He then travels with Adamus to Chicago, helping Samuel, Malcolm, and the Garde in the fight against the Mogadorians. Dust goes with Adamus, Six, and Seven to the Sanctuary but stays outside to guard against Mogadorians.

=== Gamera ===
Gamera is a Chimæra who arrives on the second ship that comes to Earth. Malcolm names this Chimæra Gamera based on a monster movie he had seen. Gamera was experimented on at the Mogadorian facility at Plum Island. Later, Gamera is left back at Ashwood Estates to protect Malcolm. In United as One, Gamera is one of the five left behind as a gift to protect the Human Garde known as Ran.

=== Olivia ===
Olivia is a Chimæra who has been with ten since they came to Earth. She is introduced in The Power of Six and is killed by 500 krauls while protecting Ten and Seven. Her body is seen underwater, lifeless from the bite wounds.

=== Regal ===
Regal is a quieter Chimæra that takes the form of a hawk. He was experimented on at the Mogadorian facility at Plum Island. Later, Regal is left at Ashwood Estates to protect Malcolm. In "United as One", Regal is one of the five left behind as a gift to protect the Human Garde known as Caleb.

=== Stanley ===
Stanley is a Chimæra sent on the second ship from Lorien. In The Forgotten Ones, Stanley is one of the Chimæra that Adamus rescued from Plum Island. In The Revenge of Seven, Sam Goode befriends his new Chimæra in the form of a fat orange cat. Sam Goode names the cat Stanley (the name of Nine's alter ego), as he believes the fat cat resembles Nine. Stanley was experimented on at the Mogadorian facility at Plum Island. Later, he is left at Ashwood Estates to protect Malcolm. In "United as One", Stanley is one of the five left behind as a gift to protect the Human Garde known as Sam Goode.

== Other Loric ==
=== Arun and Lyn ===
Arun and Lyn are Six's parents and are Gardes with Legacies. They are good friends with Lara and Liren, Four's parents. Arun and Lyn were likely killed when the Mogadorians invaded Lorien.

Their Legacies include:

- Telekinesis – All Garde can move objects with their mind.
- Enhancement – All Garde have enhanced strength, speed, senses, reflexes, endurance, and durability.

=== Devektra ===
Devektra is a Garde on Lorien. She can sing, dance, read minds, and communicate telepathically. She is mentioned in Nine's Legacy and makes a few appearances in The Last Days Of Lorien. She meets Sandor, Nine's Cêpan, at the night club known as the Chimaera and grows to like him. She invites Sandar to return to the Chimaera for the Quarter-Moon. Devektra likes Sandor because he is different, like her. It is implied that they have mutual romantic feelings because of the kiss and the hug they share before and during the invasion of Lorien. She says goodbye to Sandor before she heads off to battle with the other Garde. Later, she saves Sandor and Nine from a Mogadorian, but she does it from a long distance. It is believed that she was killed during the invasion of Lorien.

Her Legacies include:

- Vox – The ability to manipulate sound waves. She used this Legacy to manipulate her voice on stage.
- Flexibus – The ability to manipulate light in any form. She used this Legacy while performing.
- Mentis – The ability to communicate with others through their mind and or read minds.
- Telekinesis – All Garde can move objects with their mind.
- Enhancement – All Garde have enhanced strength, speed, senses, reflexes, endurance, and durability.

=== Erina ===
Erina is Ten's mother and Raylan's wife. Because Raylan isolates himself from the Loric city, the Elders send Erina to keep an eye on Raylan. She plays and flies with the Chimaera, creating bursts of currents of electricity. Erina and Raylan fall in love and get married. Erina gives birth to Ten hours before the invasion of the Mogadorians. Raylan plans to leave Lorien with Ten but gets into a ferocious argument with Erina. He stays to fight and tells Crayton to be Ten's Cêpan. Erina most likely died fighting when the Mogadorians invaded Lorien.

Her Legacies include:

- Elecomun – The ability to create, manipulate and control electrical currents.
- Avex – The ability to fly.
- Telekinesis – All Garde can move objects with their mind.
- Enhancement – All Garde have enhanced strength, speed, senses, reflexes, endurance, and durability.

=== Four's Grandfather and Grandmother ===
Four's grandparents are only seen in flashbacks of Lorien's past. Grandfather and Grandmother raise Four. Grandfather is a Garde and fights against the Mogadorians during the invasion and dies in battle. Henri remembers Grandfather fondly, telling Four that Grandfather loved to make people laugh and frequently made jokes and pranks with his invisibility Legacy. Four's grandparents complimented each other greatly. His grandfather was carefree, while his grandmother was quieter, making sure things go to plan behind the scenes. Four remembers that his Grandfather saw him off in the earthbound airship; his grandparents hugged him and said goodbye before returning to the battle.

Grandfather's Legacies include:

- Lumen – Grandfather can produce heat, light, and fire from his hands. This also would have made his entire body resistant to heat and fire.
- Novis – Grandfather can turn invisible.
- Telekinesis – All Garde can move objects with their mind.
- Enhancement – All Garde have enhanced strength, speed, senses, reflexes, endurance, and durability.

=== Janus ===
Janus pilots the ship that carries the nine Garde and their Cêpan to Earth. He tells his sister, Zophie, about his mission, leading her to join the second ship carrying Ten. After arriving on earth, Janus tries to hide the ship but is captured by the Mogadorians. After being tortured, he reveals information about the nine Garde children. He is killed afterward.

=== Liren ===
Liren is Four's father. He was a Garde on Lorien and was good friends with Henri (Cêpan of Four) and Six's parents, Arun and Lyn. He was likely killed when the Mogadorians invaded Lorien.

Liren's Legacies include:

- Sturma – The ability to control the weather using elemental manipulation.
- Telekinesis – All Garde can move objects with their mind.
- Enhancement – All Garde have enhanced strength, speed, senses, reflexes, endurance, and durability.
- Avex – Liren could fly

=== Lexa ===
Lexa is a Loric with superb electronic skills. She joins the Lorien Defense Academy and completed many projects. After hearing about her little brother's death, she is devastated and leaks government information to the public, blaming them for Zane's death and viewing them as corrupt. On the day of the Mogadorian invasion, Lexa was contacted by Zophie, an old friend, to pilot a ship from a museum. After escaping, Lexa, Zophie, Crayton, Ten, and a handful of Chimera waited a year and a half to arrive on Earth. After crashing onto Earth, Lexa and Zophie take the Chimera with them to the United States to look for Janus. Lexa contacts a Mog who shows her a clip of a tortured Janus, which she kept secret from Zophie. Later, while doing some solo investigating, Zophie makes a contact with hopes of finding her brother but reveals her location. Through a security camera, Lexa watches in horror as Zophie is killed and the Chimera are taken. Lexa becomes determined to fight back using her computer skills.

In The Lost Files: The Fugitive, Lexa contacts Mark James under the alias of GUARD. She appears to him as a bike courier and later reveals herself to Mark and Sarah at the hidden ship that the Garde used to escape the Mog invasion.

=== Lara ===
Lara is Four's mother. She is a Garde on Lorien and was good friends with Henri (Cêpan of Four) and Six's parents, Arun and Lyn. She is likely killed when the Mogadorians invade Lorien.

Lara's Legacies include:

- Telekinesis – All Garde can move objects with their mind.
- Enhancement – All Garde have enhanced strength, speed, senses, reflexes, endurance, and durability.

=== Nine's Grandfather ===
Nine's Grandfather was a Garde on Lorien. In The Last Days Of Lorien, he is seen with a young Nine, living in a hut just west of Lorien's Main City (City Centre), along with their pet Chimaera. At the end of the story, Lorien is under attack by the Mogadorians, and Sandor takes Nine to the evacuation ship. Before leaving, Nine's Grandfather tells Sandor that he is to be Nine's Cêpan. Using his Legacy to see glimpses of people's destiny, Nine's Grandfather predicts that Sandor will be important to the Nine and will play a role in the war against the Mogadorians. At the last second, he also predicts Sandor's death saying, "You will die.". Nine's Grandfather dies during the invasion of the planet Lorien.

His Legacies include:

- Precognition – Ability to see the future. Nine's Grandfather described it as having rare glimpses at the threads of destiny.
- Telekinesis – All Garde can move objects with their mind.
- Enhancement – All Garde have enhanced strength, speed, senses, reflexes, endurance, and durability.

=== Raylan ===
Raylan is Ten's father and Erina's husband. He is a wealthy descendant of the Tenth Elder of Lorien. After the Tenth Elder was killed during the Secret Wars, the Lorien government covered it up to protect the planet's image as a utopia. Raylan is angered when the government reduces the Elders' numbers to nine. He self-isolates from the Loric city along with his Chimaera and Crayton, who tended to his Chimaera. (This proves that Raylan's father is Setrakus Ra. In The Revenge of Seven, Setrakus Ra says that Ten is his granddaughter.) Raylan plans to leave Lorien with Ten but gets into a ferocious argument with his wife. Instead, Raylan agrees to stay and fight. He tells Crayton to be Ten's Cêpan and take care of her. Raylan likely died fighting when the Mogadorians invaded Lorien.

Raylan's Legacies include:

- Photokinesis – Ability to manipulate light. Although it is not said that he had the Legacy of Photokinesis, he can manipulate the light spectrum.
- Telekinesis – All Garde can move objects with their mind.
- Enhancement – All Garde have enhanced strength, speed, senses, reflexes, endurance, and durability.

=== Zane ===
Zane is Lexa's little brother. He is a Garde with dreams of being the 10th Elder. He shows great potential during his training at the Lorien Defense Academy. However, after developing his flight Legacy, he flies too fast and crashes into a ship, resulting in his death.

Zane's Legacies include:

- Avex – Zane was able to fly at fast speeds.
- Telekinesis – All Garde can move objects with their mind.
- Enhancement – All Garde have enhanced strength, speed, senses, reflexes, endurance, and durability.

=== Zophie ===
Zophie is the sister of Janus and Lexa's friend. She helps arrange the escape on the second ship with Reynolds for the Chimera and Ten. One of Zophie's biggest concerns is reuniting with her brother. However, her obsession leads to her demise as she responds to one of the Mog's Internet traps. This leads to the capture of the Chimera, which leads to the events of The Lost Files: The Forgotten Ones. Zophie is killed by one of the Mogs, with Lexa watching from a monitor.
