= Wagman =

Wagman is a surname. Notable people with the surname include:

- Frederick H. Wagman (1912–1994), American librarian, president of the American Library Association
- Joey Wagman (born 1991), American-Israeli baseball player
- Nicholas E. Wagman (1905–1980), American astronomer
- Nick Wagman (born 1973), American dressage rider
- Stuart Wagman (1919–2007), American chess master

== See also ==
- Nicholas E. Wagman Observatory of the Amateur Astronomers Association of Pittsburgh
- 3110 Wagman, asteroid
