= I Am Number Four (film) =

2011 film by D. J. Caruso

- Theatrical release poster
- Directed by: D. J. Caruso
- Screenplay by: Alfred Gough; Miles Millar; Marti Noxon
- Based on: I Am Number Four by Pittacus Lore
- Produced by: Michael Bay
- Starring: Alex Pettyfer; Timothy Olyphant; Teresa Palmer; Dianna Agron; Callan McAuliffe; Kevin Durand
- Cinematography: Guillermo Navarro
- Edited by: Vince Filippone; Jim Page
- Music by: Trevor Rabin
- Production companies: DreamWorks Pictures; Reliance Big Entertainment; Bay Films
- Distributed by: Walt Disney Studios Motion Pictures (Note: Distributed by Walt Disney Studios Motion Pictures through the Touchstone Pictures banner.)
- Release date: February 18, 2011
- Running time: 109 minutes
- Country: United States
- Language: English
- Budget: $60 million
- Box office: $149.9 million

I Am Number Four is a 2011 American science fiction action film directed by D. J. Caruso and written by Alfred Gough, Miles Millar, and Marti Noxon, based on the first novel in the Lorien Legacies young adult series. The film stars Alex Pettyfer, Timothy Olyphant, Teresa Palmer, Dianna Agron, and Callan McAuliffe. The film follows a teenage alien on Earth fleeing other aliens who are hunting him down.

Produced by Michael Bay, I Am Number Four was the first film production from DreamWorks Pictures to be released by Touchstone Pictures, as part of the studio's 2009 distribution deal with Walt Disney Studios Motion Pictures. The Hollywood Reporter estimated the budget to be between $50 million and $60 million. The film was released in both conventional and IMAX theatres on February 18, 2011, received generally negative reviews, but was a box-office success, grossing $149.9 million against a budget of $50‒59 million. All plans for a sequel were cancelled due to the film's poor performance. A reboot, produced by Neal H. Moritz, with Gough and Millar returning to write, is currently in the works.

== Plot ==
John Smith is an alien from the planet Lorien. He was sent to Earth as a child with eight others, collectively called the Garde, to escape the invading Mogadorians, who destroyed Lorien. John is protected by a guardian (who is called Cêpan), Henri, and has developed powers, including enhanced strength, speed and agility.

The Mogadorians, led by a commander, learn about the nine children and travel to Earth. The Garde can only be killed in sequence; Number One through Number Nine. Three of them are already dead, with John being Number Four. Knowing this, he and Henri move from a beachside bungalow in Florida to an old farm in Paradise, Ohio, where John befriends conspiracy theorist Sam Goode and a Beagle which he names Bernie Kosar. He also falls for an amateur photographer, Sarah Hart. Her ex-boyfriend, football player Mark James, is a bully who torments both John and Sam.

During the Spring Scream Festival, Mark and his friends chase Sarah and John into the woods. When they attack, John uses his powers to fend them off and rescue Sarah. Sam witnesses this, which leads John to reveal his true origins. The next day, Mark's father, the local sheriff, interrogates Henri on John's whereabouts when his son and his friends were attacked. Henri tells John that too many people are suspicious and they have to leave. John refuses because of Sarah.

The Mogadorians continue searching for John, while being trailed by Number Six, who is also trying to locate Number Four. Number Six's guardian was killed, and she realizes that the remaining six Garde will have to team up and fight against the Mogadorians.

The Mogadorians locate John and manipulate two conspiracy theorists into capturing Henri. When John and Sam go to rescue Henri, they have to fend off an attack by the Mogadorians. Henri dies, while John and Sam escape with some Lorien artifacts, including a blue rock that acts as a tracking device for other Garde. Sam's father, a conspiracy theorist who disappeared while hunting aliens in Mexico, had another of the rocks. While Sam searches for it, John tries to say goodbye to Sarah at a party, only to discover that the Mogadorians have framed him and Henri for the murders of the conspiracy theorists. Mark sees John and calls his father, who corners John and Sarah. John saves Sarah from a fall, revealing his powers, and they escape to their school.

The Mogadorian commander arrives in Paradise with a convoy of trucks. He is confronted by Mark and his father, and after injuring the sheriff, he forces Mark to show him where John is hiding, which Mark has deduced is the school.

John, Sarah, and Sam are attacked by the Mogadorians, who brought two Pikens (enormous, batlike creatures) to hunt the trio. They are saved by Number Six and Bernie, who is actually a shapeshifting Chimera sent by John's biological parents to protect him. John and Number Six, who can turn invisible and can block energy attacks, continue to fight the Mogadorians. They eventually defeat them all, including the commander.

The following day, John and Number Six unite their blue rocks and discover the location of the other four surviving Garde. John lets Sam come with them in hopes of finding Sam's father. They set off to find the others so they can protect Earth from the Mogadorians, leaving Sarah and a repentant Mark, who lies to his father about John's whereabouts. Mark also returns a magic box left to John by his Dad, that was in police evidence. John thanks Mark and promises Sarah that he will come back to her. While they share a goodbye kiss, Mark is visibly resigned to their relationship. John, Sam, Bernie and Number Six drive off, vowing to protect Earth.

== Cast ==
- Alex Pettyfer as Daniel / John Smith / Number Four
- Timothy Olyphant as Henri
- Teresa Palmer as Number Six
- Dianna Agron as Sarah Hart
- Callan McAuliffe as Sam Goode
- Kevin Durand as Setrakus Ra, the Mogadorian Commander
- Jake Abel as Mark James
- Garrett M. Brown as Mr. Simms
- Brian Howe as Frank
- Jeff Hochendoner as Sheriff James
- Greg Townley as Number Three
- Reuben Langdon as Number Three's Guardian
- Judith Hoag as Mrs. Hart
- Charles Carroll as Mr. Goode
- Ken Beck as Jackson
- Tucker Albrizzi as Tuck
- Emily Wickersham as Nicole
- Patrick Sebes as Kevin
- Andy Owen as Bret
- L. Derek Leonidoff as Mr. Berhman
- Megan Follows as Supermarket Cashier
- Sabrina de Matteo as Physics Teacher
- Cooper Thornton as Mr. Hart
- Jack Walz as Sarah's Brother
- Bill Laing as Demented Farmer
- Beau Mirchoff as Drew
- Cody Johns as Kern

== Production ==
=== Development ===
The film was produced by DreamWorks and Reliance Entertainment. Film producer and director Michael Bay brought the manuscript of the young adult novel I Am Number Four to Stacey Snider and Steven Spielberg at DreamWorks. A bidding war developed for the film rights between DreamWorks and J. J. Abrams, with DreamWorks winning the rights in June 2009, with the intention of having Bay produce and possibly direct the project. The rights were purchased with the hope of attracting teenage fans of The Twilight Saga films, and the potential of establishing a film franchise, with at least six more installments planned by the book's publisher.

Al Gough and Miles Millar, the creators of the television series Smallville, were hired to write the screenplay in August 2009. Marti Noxon, writer and producer for the television series Buffy the Vampire Slayer, also contributed to the screenplay. D. J. Caruso was brought on to direct in early 2010, after Bay opted to focus on directing the third film of the Transformers series. Caruso had been selected by Spielberg to direct Disturbia and Eagle Eye for DreamWorks, and had success with both films. Caruso had less than a year to prepare, shoot and edit the film, due to a worldwide release date set for Presidents Day weekend.

Chris Bender, J.C. Spink, and David Valdes executive produced the film. Spielberg contributed to the film's characters, but did not take a credit on the film. It was the first DreamWorks film to be released by Disney's Touchstone Pictures label, as part of the 30-picture distribution deal between DreamWorks and Walt Disney Studios Motion Pictures. The film was also the first release for DreamWorks after the studio's financial restructuring in 2008.

=== Casting ===
In March 2010, Alex Pettyfer was in talks to play the title character in the film, Number Four. It was later confirmed that the 21-year-old British actor would play the lead. Sharlto Copley was going to star as Henri, Number Four's guardian and mentor, but had to drop out due to press obligations with his film The A-Team. Copley was replaced by Timothy Olyphant. Kevin Durand plays the villain of the film, Commander, the Mogadorian who leads the hunt for the Loriens on Earth.

DreamWorks went through multiple rounds of tests to find the right actress for the female romantic lead. Dianna Agron, a star in the Fox television series Glee, won the role. She plays Sarah Hart, a girl who used to date a high school football player, but falls for Number Four and keeps his secret. Jake Abel plays the football player, Mark James, an antagonist in the film. Teresa Palmer plays the other Loric, Number Six, and 16-year-old Australian actor Callan McAuliffe plays Sam Goode, Number Four's best friend.

=== Filming ===
Principal photography began on May 17, 2010, using 20 locations all within the Pittsburgh metropolitan area. DreamWorks selected the area primarily due to tax incentives from the Pennsylvania Film Production Tax Credit. The film studio also had a positive experience shooting She's Out of My League in Pittsburgh in 2008. The production was scheduled to last 12 to 13 weeks.

Cinematographer Guillermo Navarro shot the film on 35 mm, using a format known as Super 1:85. Beaver, the former Conley Inn in Homewood, and nearby Buttermilk Falls were used as locations in the film; interior and exterior scenes were shot near a boat launch in Monaca. A spring fair scene was filmed in Deer Lakes Park in West Deer; Port Vue, North Park, New Kensington and Hyde Park were also used as locations. The setting of the film's fictional town of Paradise, Ohio is Vandergrift, Pennsylvania, where filming took place from June to July 2010. Producers chose Vandergrift as the "hero town" of the film because of its unique look and curved streets, laid out by Frederick Law Olmsted, the designer of New York City's Central Park.

Franklin Regional High School in Murrysville was chosen over 50 other schools in the area, due to its proximity to nearby woods, a part of the film's plot, and its surrounding hills. The school was also selected for its one floor layout, wide hallways, and its football stadium in front. Teachers and recent graduates appear in the film, and a set that replicates the school was built in a studio in Monroeville for filming explosion scenes. In the last few weeks of production, scenes were filmed at the 200-year-old St. John's Lutheran Stone Church in Lancaster Township. Additional filming took place in the Florida Keys in the beginning of the film in Big Pine Key, Florida, as well as the spanning of the drive over the bridge showcases the keys 7 mile bridge.

=== Post-production ===
I Am Number Four was edited by Jim Page, with Industrial Light & Magic developing the visual effects for the alien Pikens. The film was scored by former Yes guitarist Trevor Rabin.

== Release ==
A teaser trailer for the film was released in late September 2010, and a full-length trailer premiered on December 8. Advertisements ran in Seventeen and Teen Vogue magazines, Disney released a promotional iPhone app in January 2011. Disney also developed Internet content to target a teen audience with their marketing campaign. A cast tour, in association with American retailer Hot Topic, and cast media appearances were scheduled to lead up to the release of the film.

I Am Number Four premiered at the Village Theatre in Los Angeles on February 9, 2011. The film was released in theaters on February 18, 2011, and was also released in the IMAX format.

=== Home media ===
The film was released by Walt Disney Studios Home Entertainment (under the Touchstone Home Entertainment label) on Blu-ray, DVD, and digital download on May 24, 2011. The release was produced in three different packages: a three-disc Blu-ray, DVD, and "Digital Copy" combo pack, a single-disc Blu-ray, and a single-disc DVD. The "Digital Copy" included with the 3-disc version is a stand-alone disc that allows users to play the film from any location via iTunes or Windows Media Player. All releases include bloopers and the "Becoming Number 6" featurette, while the single-disc Blu-ray and three-disc Blu-ray, DVD, and "Digital Copy" combo pack versions additionally include six deleted scenes with an introduction from the director. In its first three weeks of release, 316,081 Blu-ray units were sold in the US, bringing in $7,693,808. As of October 2, 2011, the standard DVD of 'I am Number Four' has sold 767,692 copies in the United States, generating $12,571,326, and thus bringing the total gross to $166,247,931.

== Reception ==
=== Box office ===
I Am Number Four grossed $55,100,437 at the North American box office and $94,778,000 overseas, for a worldwide total of $149,878,437. It topped the worldwide box office on its second weekend (February 25–27, 2011) with $28,086,805.

The film opened at number two in the United States and Canada with a gross of $19,449,893. In its second weekend, it dropped 43.4%, earning $11,016,126. The only other market where it has grossed over $10 million is China. It began in third place with $3.4 million, but had an increase of 91% in its second week, topping the box office with $6.4 million. In its third week, it decreased by 21% to $5.0 million. As of March 27, 2011, it has grossed $17,328,244.

=== Critical response ===
Review aggregation website Rotten Tomatoes reports a 32% approval rating and an average rating of 4.70/10 based on 167 reviews. The website's consensus reads, "It's positioned as the start of a franchise, but I Am Number Four's familiar plot and unconvincing performances add up to one noisy, derivative, and ultimately forgettable sci-fi thriller." Metacritic gives the film an average score of 36 out of 100 based on reviews from 30 critics, indicating "generally unfavorable" reviews. Audiences polled by CinemaScore gave the film an average grade of "B+" on an A+ to F scale.

Empire gave the film three out of a possible five stars and said, "If you can make it through the bland schmaltz of the first half you'll be rewarded with a spectacular blast of sustained action and the promise of even better to come. This could be the start of something great."

== Soundtrack ==
1. "Radioactive" – Kings of Leon
2. "Tighten Up" – The Black Keys
3. "Rolling in the Deep" – Adele
4. "Somebody's Watching Me" – Rockwell
5. "Shelter" – The xx
6. "Soldier On" – The Temper Trap
7. "Invented" – Jimmy Eat World
8. "Curfew" – Beck
9. "As She's Walking Away" – Zac Brown Band (ft. Alan Jackson)
10. "Letters from the Sky" – Civil Twilight

== Future ==
=== Cancelled sequel ===
In 2011, screenwriter Noxon told Collider that plans for an imminent sequel were shelved due to the disappointing performance of the first installment at the box office. In 2013, director Caruso was asked if there are any possibilities that The Power of Six will get a movie adaption, he replied: "There's been some talk in the past couple of months about trying to do something because there is this audience appetite out there [...]. Most of the people on Twitter that contact me from all over the world ask, "Where's the next movie?" I think DreamWorks is getting those too so it'll be interesting. I don't know if I'd be involved, but I know they're talking about it."

Asked about a sequel for the 10th anniversary of the film in 2021, Alex Pettyfer told Screen Rant that DreamWorks scrapped their whole slate of films at the time for funding reasons, suggesting that DreamWorks' blockbusters released during that period had collectively underperformed.

=== Reboot ===
In April 2024, I Am Number Four author James Frey confirmed in an interview with Sci-Fi & Fantasy Gazette that Neal H. Moritz was producing a new adaptation of the series, with screenwriters Gough and Millar returning, although he noted that he was unsure if the project would be made or not.
