= Amateur Astronomers Association of Pittsburgh =

The Amateur Astronomers Association of Pittsburgh (AAAP) is an Astronomical Organization founded on June 9, 1929, by Chester B. Roe and Leo J. Scanlon. Since its establishment, it has grown to have over 500 members and operates two observatories in the Pittsburgh region: the Nicholas E. Wagman Observatory and the Mingo Creek Park Observatory. The club also sponsors many star parties that are open to the public throughout the year.

The club's motto is "We have loved the stars too fondly to be fearful of the night", which is taken from Sarah Williams' poem "The Old Astronomer to his Pupil".

The AAAP has been promoting popular astronomy in Western Pennsylvania for 75 years and is one of the larger astronomy clubs in the nation, with over 500 members. During monthly meetings, upcoming celestial events such as meteor showers, comets, occultations, and planetary alignments are announced, and observations and techniques are shared so that all members may benefit from the experiences. Each meeting also features a special speaker, sometimes an AAAP member, as well as outside experts from various fields. Past speakers have presented topics including meteorite hunting in Antarctica, cosmological modeling using supercomputers, and astrophotography with exotic equipment such as dry-ice cameras.

== Facilities ==
=== Nicholas E. Wagman Observatory ===
The Nicholas E. Wagman Observatory is home to two permanent telescopes, including the Brashear 11-inch refractor.

The Wagman Observatory hill, located in the northeast corner of Deer Lakes Park at 40°37′34″N 79°48′44″W, is an ideal location for an astronomical facility. At 1340 feet elevation, it is one of the highest points in Allegheny County, and one of the few such sites not already occupied by a radio mast, microwave relay tower, or water tank. The hill is believed to have been used as a lookout by local Indian tribes such as the Seneca, who used it to watch game and the activities of neighboring tribes. The observatory provides an almost 100% view of the sky. Additionally, its location in a relatively rural country park protects it from most commercial or residential development, which could cause excessive light pollution.

The AAAP owns and operates the Observatory, which was originally built in 1987 and expanded in 1995. It is the first and only amateur astronomical observatory in Western Pennsylvania dedicated to public education and enjoyment of the science of astronomy. Members use the facility for recreational and scientific observations, as well as scheduled public viewing evenings known as Star Parties, as well as recreational and scientific observations by members. During these events, visitors can view celestial objects through the observatory's two large permanent telescopes: the Brashear 11-inch Refractor and the Wade D. Barbin 21.5-inch Reflector (formerly the Manka Memorial Telescope), a 21-inch Newtonian Reflector, or any of the portable telescopes set up on the grounds by members. Additionally, the observatory is available for use by scout groups, science classes from local schools, and civic groups.

=== Mingo Creek Park Observatory ===
The Mingo Creek Park Observatory was dedicated on August 27, 2005. The observatory is located at 40°12′41″N 80°1′13″W, elevation 1150 feet in Mingo Creek County Park south of Pittsburgh in Nottingham Township east of Washington, PA.

The Mingo Creek Park Observatory is owned and operated by the AAAP. The observatory was built in the spring/summer of 2004, and officially dedicated in August 2005. It has become the largest amateur astronomical observatory in Southwestern Pennsylvania dedicated to public education and enjoyment of the science of astronomy. The mission of the Mingo Creek Park Observatory is to educate and make freely available to a diverse public of all ages, programs on astronomy and the preservation of dark skies. The facility is used for scheduled public viewing evenings (Star Parties), as well as the recreational and scientific observations of the membership. During Star Parties visitors are able to view celestial objects through the observatory's two large permanent telescopes, a 24-inch RC Reflector and the D&G 10-inch Refractor, or any of a wide variety of portable telescopes set up on the grounds by members. The observatory has been a destination and center of astronomical activities for scout groups, science classes from local schools, and civic groups.

The AAAP has acquired a planetarium projector and dome that has become a popular educational tool for the new observatory. Visitors attending a star party can see a short basic planetarium program on the night sky, and step directly outside and look up (or through a telescope) to see what was just shown to them inside. This is especially useful on cloudy nights, along with the classroom astronomy displays, AV presentations, and computer projected lectures.

=== Greene County Site ===
Despite the Wagman observatory being in a remote region of Allegheny County, light pollution remains an issue for astronomers who wish to view the stars. The Greene County Site is not affected as much by light pollution, and is located on a privately owned cow pasture where AAAP members are permitted to use portable telescopes and equipment for astronomical observations.

== See also ==
- List of astronomical societies
