= Lorien Legacies =

Series of novels by James Frey

- I Am Number Four; The Power of Six; The Rise of Nine; The Fall of Five; The Revenge of Seven; The Fate of Ten; I am number four - On live and dead United as One; Generation One; Fugitive Six; Return To Zero
- Author: Pittacus Lore (James Frey and Jobie Hughes)
- Country: United States
- Language: English
- Genre: Young adult, science fiction
- Publisher: HarperCollins
- Published: August 2010–June 2016
- Media type: print/digital (hardcover and paperback)
- Followed by: Lorien Legacies Reborn

Lorien Legacies is a series of young adult science fiction books, written by James Frey, Jobie Hughes, and formerly, Greg Boose, under the collective pseudonym Pittacus Lore.

The title of the series refers to the characters' home planet of Lorien, which itself is likely a reference to the Elf realm of Lórien in the Lord of the Rings book series by J. R. R. Tolkien, though this has never been confirmed.

== Lorien Legacies ==
=== I am Number Four ===
The first book of The Lorien Legacies was released on August 3, 2010. The Loric are a nearly extinct race of extraterrestrials due to a deadly battle with another alien race, the Mogadorians. The only survivors are nine teenagers and their corresponding guardians, Cêpans, who escaped to Earth. Now the Mogadorians intend to finish the job. Numbers One, Two, and Three have already been killed, causing three circular brands to appear on the ankles of the remaining Loric. The book is told from the perspective of Number Four, also known as John Smith, who is the next target for the Mogadorians. He and his Cêpan, Henri, move from place to place, changing their identities to keep themselves hidden. John begins inheriting Legacies, the ancestral powers of special Loric known as Garde and must learn to keep his them hidden from his human friends.

=== The Power of Six ===
The second book of The Lorien Legacies was released on August 23, 2011. The story is told by two members of the Garde: Number Seven (Marina), who is hiding at a convent in Spain, and Number Four (John Smith), who is on the run with Sam, Number Six, and Bernie Kosar (John Smith's Chimæra). While John, Six and Sam try to stay ahead of the Mogadorians and search for the other surviving Loric, Marina searches for news of John after his battle at the school that came at the end of I Am Number Four. While at the convent, Marina also meets a young girl named Ella who is later revealed to be Number Ten, a younger Loric who came to earth on a separate aircraft than the other nine with her own Cêpan, Crayton. Marina is tracked down by Mogadorians at the end of the book, but she is helped to evade them by Crayton and Ella, along with Number Six, who travelled to Spain in search of Number Seven. Meanwhile, Sam and Number Four go to the Mogadorian base in West Virginia to find Number Four and Number Six's stolen Loric Chests. The two are successful in finding both the chests and another member of the Garde, Number Nine, but when escaping the base Sam is left behind, and Four, Nine, and Bernie Kosar leave alone.

=== The Rise of Nine ===
The third book of The Lorien Legacies was released on August 21, 2012. John and Nine escape from the Mogadorian base and head to Chicago, where Nine's penthouse is located. They meet up with Six, Eight, Marina and Ella, the tenth child who escaped on the only other ship to escape Lorien during the Mogadorian invasion with three others. While Six, Eight, Marina and Ella attempt to teleport to New Mexico, Six becomes stranded and gets kidnapped by the Mogadorians. The remaining Loric invade Dulce base to free Six, Sarah, and Sam, as well as fight Setrakus Ra, leader of the Mogadorians.

=== The Fall of Five ===
The fourth book of The Lorien Legacies was released on August 27, 2013. This book is also told in the first person perspective, between Sam Goode, John Smith (Four), and Marina (Seven).

=== The Revenge of Seven ===
The fifth book of The Lorien Legacies was released on August 26, 2014. It is narrated in the first person, with Number Four (John), Number Six, and Ella as narrators.

=== The Fate of Ten ===
The sixth book of The Lorien Legacies was released on September 1, 2015. Its title was revealed via the Facebook page for the series. It was also revealed that there would be seven books in the series, rather than the previously believed six. The cover for the book was released on the 23rd of April 2015 in an interview with MTV. The book is primarily narrated in first person from the perspectives of Four (John), Six and, towards the end of the book, Ten (Ella). A prologue in third person briefly narrates the story of an unnamed human-turned-Garde (later known as Daniela) as she survives a Mogadorian attack on New York.

=== United As One ===
The seventh and final book of The Lorien Legacies. The title was revealed on October 26, 2015. It was released on June 28, 2016. United as One is told in first perspective of two characters, Number Four (John Smith) and Number Six.

The fact that Four (John) has Ximic may hint at the fact that he is Pittacus' descendant, as Ella is Setrákus'. Other clues include physical features, such as blonde hair, and Pittacus' Lumen.

Marina stands on the edge of a cliff in a dream, after she was left unconscious after a fight with Setrákus Ra. She sees Setrákus Ra taking the appearance of Eight, convincing her to let go and be with Eight, but she refuses and chooses to continue to fight. Five is in a padded cell, locked up by Nine and John. Setrákus Ra also comes to him in a dream to convince him to come back on his side. Five refuses. Mark walks the football field of his old school in Paradise, clutching a photo of Sarah. He is met by Setrákus Ra who tries to tell Mark he can bring Sarah back and they can fight together. It is unknown if Mark accepts the offer.

John is in Patience Creek with Sam and Daniella when Ella, Marina, Six, Mark, Adam, and Lexa arrive.

The Garde regroup and John has a moment with the deceased Sarah, and Mark is disgusted at his lack of emotion and blames him for her death. The Garde talk tactics with Lawson, the acting general. John becomes increasingly cold and distant, no longer content with playing defense. A plan is hatched to hijack one of the warships and to strip the skimmers of their cloaking devices to coordinate a united strike against the other Mogadorian warships.

Some new Human-Garde post a video on the internet to attract John's attention to have him pick them up as they stand by a Loralite stone in Niagara Falls. The team splits, with half going to rescue the human Garde, while John and Nine meet with Five, who is locked away in a cell. John wants Five to teach him how to fly so he can board the warship. However, he struggles to pick up the legacy, so Five attacks him, hoping the battle rush would help him learn the skill, which he does. However, Marina wakes up and levitates an icicle in front of Five's face, threatening to kill him.

The other team, en route to Niagara Falls, encounter turbulence when Sam uses his technopathic legacy to accidentally turn off the ship's engines. With some help from Ella, Sam can visualize the workings of the ship and turn them back on. When they arrive on the scene they see fresh signs of a battle, with Skimmers destroyed and fire and ash swirling. The human Garde managed to hold their own and fought off the Mogadorians. However, there is some disagreement if the teens are ready for war. To avoid any further people teleporting to Niagara Falls, Ella turns off the Loralite stone. As a neighboring warship makes its way there to check in, the team leaves for the base.

Adam instigates dissension in the Mogadorian ranks. A warship fires on Sydney while another captain in Moscow declares himself the beloved leader, which leads to the captain in Berlin making an assassination attempt on the usurper. In Kazakhstan, another 2 warships meet and began to blow each other apart.

Sam attempts to use his techno legacy to copy the cloaking device codes into everyday electronics, he builds a prototype that he asks the team to test when they attack the warship.

John, Six, and Adam board the warship. John begins killing all the Mogadorians in a cold ruthless manner, while Adam and Six strip the skimmers of their cloaking devices. Before the day is done the Garde have stolen a warship. They meet a Mogadorian named Rex, whom Adam recognizes and saves from John's attack. Sam's tech is found to be successful.

John, not wanting to sacrifice any more friends, takes off to finish Setrákus without the others knowing. He realizes he needs a cloaking device and heads back to Patience Creek. However, the base is overrun by Mogadorians, who found the place through a mind-controlled Mark James. Some of the true-borns have augmentations, twisted forms of legacies. Phiri dun Ra is there, whose arm has been replaced with black ooze-like tendrils, then she impales John and begins to drain his legacies while he's helpless. While helpless, Mark James slips the Voron noose around John's neck. The damage from this weapon cannot be healed.

The others find out about John's suicide mission and argue among themselves over his chosen course of action. Six calls Sam to tell him about his prototype's success when she hears firing in the background. Sam tells Six he thinks they are under attack.

Back at the base, John is helpless as he's dragged along the inside of the base, with Phiri mocking his failure at being a hero and his delusional idea of being able to save everyone. To prove a point she kills Mark. Phiri, John and the mind-controlling Mogadorians run into resistance. The mind-controlling Mogadorian releases a swarm of seemingly black flies that force half the marines to open fire on the others. The human garde make an appearance and are shocked to see John crawling on all fours with a noose around his neck. He screams at them to run but Phiri manages to kill 2 while the other 2 manage to escape. Sam shouts at the lights to turn off and frees Five who immediately attacks Phiri, however, the mind-controlling Mogadorian manages to overtake Five, but is quickly killed by Sam. Phiri screams for extraction and loses her grip on John as Five slams into her. The shadow Mogadorian makes an appearance and teleports both Phiri and Five. The shadow Mogadorian tries to finish them off, but Sam tells the lights to turn on while he's mid-teleport, which slices him in half.

The others have no time to mourn the dead and set their plan in motion. The Garde use the loralite stone to teleport across the world arming the governments with cloaking tech.

The Garde, aboard their stolen warship, make their way to the West Virginia base where Setrákus waits. Six summons the biggest storm she has ever created to damage the Anubis, destroying it. Five flies Six and Adam into the base to deactivate the shield, once that's done, Marina, John, Five, and Nine make their way underground to find Setrákus.

They find a mass grave of Mogadorians and Garde Humans, which repulses them all and steels their drives to end this. Setrákus emerges from a pool of black ooze covered in black slime that has given him a youthful appearance and effective immortality. They try to fight against him, however, their legacies are ineffective against him. Setrákus grabs Five and drowns him in the black puddle. He maims Nine, taking off his arm. While trying to heal him, Marina attacks Setrákus with her healing legacy, to which he recoils in pain. John, picking up on this, continues the healing assault and urges Marina to run with Nine, who is in no shape to fight, she protests but John insists. Nine transfers his strength and anti-gravity legacy to her and she slings him over her shoulder and runs. John is locked in battle with Setrákus with both of them taking heavy damage, while John pours his healing legacy into him, while also using it on himself in small bursts to keep him going. He establishes telepathic contact with Sam and tells him to blow up the mountain.

While this is going on Adam and Six run into Phiri, who wounds Six and attacks Adam, Dust attacks Phiri but is quickly overwhelmed. Six manages to telekinetically pin Phiri to the wall, but a Mogadoraian sneaks behind her and shoots her, Adam promptly kills the Mogadorian but Phiri impales him and begins to drain his Loric spark, she releases a seismic wave that knocks Six back. Adam plunges his hands into the black oily tentacles and begins to tear itself away from Phiri's stump and bond with Adam. He uses his seismic legacy and collapses the floor with both Adam and Phiri falling in. Six attempts to save him but there's nothing there to telekinetically grab. Six realizes Dust has disappeared. Ella urges Six to make her way to the main entrance where Marina and Nine are on their way. Marina tries to get Six out of the base, but she refuses, asking Marina to heal her so she can finish the battle.

Six makes her way to the central chamber where John lays beaten and broken. She sees a frail withered old man crawling across the cavern floor she picks up the Voron dagger and decapitates him. She makes her way over to John who she thinks is dead but a gasp from John proves otherwise. His eyes swollen shut he grasps Six' arm and whispers 'Sarah?', Six gives him a quick kiss before he falls unconscious. Six grabs John and they climb on to Bernie Kosar's back and fly up. John remembers snippets after that such as seeing Adam crying as he clutched the final form of Dust who was frozen in a wolf/snake form. John decides to close his eyes not wanting to see any more sadness.

One year later John is secluded in the Himalayas restoring the cave that Eight had found. He scrubs the prophecies from the wall and Ella, who has kept him company for some months, tells him it is time. Clutching a small box, he flies to the Garde academy under construction in San Francisco to meet the others. John apologizes and gives Nine something from his box. Lexa is also at the academy hacking into the dark web protecting the human Garde from potential threats.

He then goes to New York where repairs and construction are still under way. He observes Daniela from afar who uses her stone legacy to repair building foundations before embracing her mother.

John sees Agent Walker in a Montreal car park where she kills someone. John reveals himself to her and she is pleased to see him, he says to her you better have a good reason for that, in response she shows what was in the man's briefcase, 3 vials of black ooze which surprises John. Walker takes out a vial from her pocket and pours it into the black ooze, destroying the substance. Walker says she could use some help tracking this down and John hands her a blue loralite pendant from his box and says they will talk about it soon.

He finds Adam in Alaska with Rex in a prison camp with other Mogs who surrendered, John says he can break them out and he replies saying this is the best place for him to rehabilitate his people. It is mentioned he got a full pardon but did not use it. John gives him a pendant.

He goes to paradise and hugs Malcolm which brings back memories of Henri. He ruminates on tracking Mark James' father to tell him what happened. Finally, he steps on Sarah's doorstep still unable to tell her parents what happened.

He tracks Six and Sam who are on their vacation. He observes them in the ocean in an embrace and leaves 2 pendants with a note.

Lastly, he looks for Marina, who John says would have taken ages to track, if not for her sporadic calls to Ella. Ella says she's not the same and has become paranoid and angry. He finds her in a speedboat navigating islands in the South Pacific. John recognizes the signs of isolation from his own experiences. When he appears she is not startled and asks if he's really there or has gone crazy. He replies that it is really him and she smiles. She says that he's come at a good time and shows him a video footage of the West Virginia base where an object that looked like a missile shoots up into the sky. Marina says she found Five last week on one of the small deserted islands. His body is very skinny with lumps of skin hanging off with dark patches of obsidian blotching his skin. Marina confides in John that she has tried to get over the war and all the death and destruction but she just can not. She tells John that he said she could decide what to do with Five but she does not want to carry it around with her. John suggests her to get out of here and Marina asks what to do with Five to which John says that he's a ghost we are not.

Marina returns with John to the Himalayas. She finally cries when she sees what he's done with the cave. She reaches out to John before thanking him and she kisses him. He's not sure what it means ruminating maybe nothing, maybe something. He shows Marina what he's been working on for the past year: a massive wooden table with a loralite stone in the middle reminiscent of the table in the Elder's chamber with the Loric symbol of unity burned into the table and the pendants. John plans to use this as a meeting place for friends and allies where they will gather to solve problems, with a space at the table for Loric/Garde/humans/allies. The only exception is that there are not nine seats around the table as he's done with numbers.

== The Lost Files series ==
=== The Legacies ===
Released on July 24, 2012, The Legacies is a paperback edition of three previously released Lost Files novellas — Six's Legacy, Nine's Legacy, and The Fallen Legacies. Originally published as individual e-books, this was the first time they were available in print.

==== Six's Legacy ====
Released on July 26, 2011, it is told from the first person perspective of Six.

Before she met John in Paradise, Ohio, she lived with her Cêpan Katarina. They were captured by the Mogadorians in NY. Katarina was killed after Six gives the Mogs false information. While in prison, Six developed her legacy of invisibility (Novis) and used it to escape. Before leaving she took revenge on the Mogadorian who killed Katarina. After years, she hears of Number Four in Ohio and takes a bus there.

==== Nine's Legacy ====
Released on February 28, 2012, it is told from the first person perspective of Pittacus Lore's character, Nine.

Nine and his Cêpan, Sandor, live in a penthouse on top of the John Hancock Center in Chicago. Nine starts to date a girl. He realizes she was being used to find him and gets captured. The Mogadorians torture Sandor to break Nine. Eventually Nine kills him to put him out of his misery. Nine is held in the West Virginia Mog compound until he's rescued by John.

==== The Fallen Legacies ====
Released on July 24, 2012, it is told from the first person perspective of Adamus Sutekh, a Mogadorian general's son.

The book starts with in front of the Washington Monument in Washington D.C. Adam and his adopted brother Ivan are doing homework. Then Adam and Ivan are called by their father. The Mogadorians have found a lead on Number One. Adam and Ivan accompany their father to Malaysia to kill Number One. A vat-born soldier (a Mogadorian soldier grown through genetic engineering) kills Number One right as she develops the legacy to create earthquakes (Terric). Once back at Ashwood Estates, a Mogadorian compound, Adam is asked by his father to be hooked up to a special machine that is connected to One's body. He falls asleep. In his deep sleep, he meets the ghost of One. One takes him through her life on Earth up until she is killed and tries to see doubt in Mogadorian progress. When Adam awakes it has been three years. Adam can not believe he's been asleep that long. But, he is just in time to accompany his father and Ivan on a mission to find Number Two. Adam gets to the apartment where she's staying first. He tells her he's there to help. Just then Ivan arrives. He thinks Adam is trying to trick the Garde and kills her himself. After however Adam deletes a post that Number Two was using to try and contact the other members of the Garde. Time passes and Number Three is located. The Mogs proceed to Kenya to find him. Adam and Ivan meet a boy named Hannu. He is Number Three. Adam tries to warn him but is too late. His father kills Three. The book ends when Adam falls down a ravine.

=== Secret Histories ===
Released on July 23, 2013, Secret Histories is a paperback edition of the second compilation of Lost Files novellas — The Search for Sam, Last Days of Lorien, and The Forgotten Ones. Originally published as e-novellas, this was the first time they were available in print.

==== The Search for Sam ====
Released on December 26, 2012, it is told from the first person perspective of Adamus Sutekh. It picks up where The Fallen Legacies left off.

==== The Last Days of Lorien ====
Released on April 9, 2013, it is set on Lorien before it was attacked by the Mogadorians, and is told from the perspective of Sandor (Nine's Cêpan).

==== The Forgotten Ones ====
Released on July 23, 2013, it is told from the first person perspective of Adamus Sutekh. It is the third and final of Pittacus Lore's novellas told by the son of a mogadorian general turned to the Loric side.

=== Hidden Enemy ===
Released on July 22, 2014, in the US and August 14, 2014, in the UK, Hidden Enemy is the third compilation of Lost Files novellas — Five's Legacy, Return to Paradise, and Five's Betrayal. Originally published as separate e-novellas this was the first time they were available in print.

==== Five's Legacy ====
Initially scheduled to be released on December 23, 2013, Five's Legacy was released as an e-Book on February 11, 2014. The novella centers around the origins of Number Five, including the short amount of time he spent with his Cêpan, Rey, and his eventual "capture" by Mogadorians.

==== Return to Paradise ====
Released on April 15, 2014, exclusively as an e-Book, this prequel companion novella covers what happened in the aftermath of the Mogadorian attack on Paradise, Ohio, from the perspective of Mark James —Number Four's bully-turned-ally.

After Four leaves town to find the rest of the Garde, Mark is left behind to pick up the pieces. His school has been destroyed, his home burned down, and, worst yet, Mark now knows the truth: aliens live among us and some of them seek to destroy us. Even with the FBI tailing him and Sarah Hart, Mark tries to return to a normal life. But when Sarah goes missing, he knows he can no longer sit back and do nothing.

==== Five's Betrayal ====
Released on July 22, 2014, this sequel to Five's Legacy finds Number Five entering the ranks of the Mogadorian army. The Mogs have convinced him that they will be the victors in the war for Earth, and Five decides he would rather be on the winning side, realizing that the only thing that matters is his survival.

=== Rebel Allies ===
Released on July 28, 2015, the fourth compilation of Lost Files novellas consists of The Fugitive, The Navigator, and The Guard. Originally published as separate e-novellas this was the first time they were available in print.

==== The Fugitive ====
Released on December 23, 2014, The Fugitive follows Mark James as he tries to track down Sarah Hart, evade the Mogadorians and the FBI, and discover the identity of the mysterious blogger he knows only as GUARD.

==== The Navigator ====
Released on April 21, 2015, The Navigator reveals the truth about the crew of the two Loric spaceships who escaped to Earth and shows what happened to the pilots after they arrived and parted ways with the Garde.

==== The Guard ====
Released on July 28, 2015, The Guard tells the story of the hacker who has been aiding the Lorien survivors from the shadows for years. She's determined to defeat the Mogs—and she just found her secret weapon.

=== Zero Hour ===
Released on May 31, 2016, the fifth compilation of Lost Files novellas consists of Legacies Reborn, Last Defense, and Hunt for The Garde. Originally published as separate e-novellas this was the first time they were available in print.

==== Legacies Reborn ====
Released on November 24, 2015, Legacies Reborn gives a look at the Mogadorian invasion from the perspective of Daniela Morales, a human teen who's shocked to discover aliens are attacking New York—and that she suddenly has the power to fight back.

==== Last Defense ====
Released on February 23, 2016, Last Defense reveals what happens to Malcolm Goode after the warships descend. To get to the president's secret bunker near Washington, DC, he'll have to fight his way through a war zone.

==== Hunt for the Garde ====
Released on May 31, 2016, Hunt for the Garde picks up after the events of The Fate of Ten, following the stories of three different Mogadorians. One will do anything for redemption; One has a thirst for blood; One questions everything.

== Extras ==
Six very short works, meant to be read in line with the seven main novels:

- Sam's Journal — Originally available on the book's official website. There are 7 entries in total.
- Sarah's Journal — Originally available on the book's official website. There are 5 entries in total.
- Malcolm's Journal — Originally available on the book's official website. There are 7 entries in total.
- Eight's Origin — A short story originally available on the book's official website. It gives an insight into Number Eight's life in the Himalayas.
- Pittacus Lore Transmissions — A bonus series of audio transmissions from Pittacus Lore. There are 7 podcasts in total, whose transcripts could be found on the book's official website, and 2 bonus entries where Pittacus answers some fan questions.
- The Scar —A Lost Files pre-order exclusive chapter of The Fall of Five.

== Lorien Legacies Reborn (Sequel series) ==
=== Generation One ===
Published on June 27, 2017.

=== Fugitive Six ===
Published on June 26, 2018.

=== Return to Zero ===
Published on June 25, 2019.

== The Legacy Chronicles series ==
=== Trial by Fire ===
- Out of the Ashes
- Into the Fire
- Up in Smoke

=== Out of the Shadows ===
- Chasing Ghosts
- Raising Monsters
- Killing Giants

== Characters ==
=== Garde ===
Character	Gender	Name / Aliases	Age (year of birth)	Status	Cêpan	Legacies (in addition to Telekinesis and Enhancement)
Number One	Female		14 (1990)	Deceased (killed by vat-born Mogadorian soldier)	Hilde (Hessu)	Terric (ability to emit seismic vibrations)
Number Two	Female	Maggie Hoyle, Mousey	12 (1995)	Deceased (killed by Mogadorian Ivanick Shu-Ra)	Conrad	
Number Three	Male	Hannu	14 (1996)	Deceased (killed by Mogadorian General Andrakkus Sutekh)	Kentra	Fortem (super strength); Omnilingualism
Number Four	Male	John Smith, Daniel Jones, Jobie Frey, James Hughes, Donald, John Kent	18-19 (1995)	Alive	Henri (Brandon)	Anima (ability to communicate with animals); Lumen; Ximic (ability to replicate other's legacies); Extrasensory perception
Number Five	Male	Cody, Zach, Carson	19-20 (1994)	Deceased (died by carrying Ran, who had absorbed the force of a nuclear warhead, into the upper atmosphere)	Rey (Albert)	Avex (ability to fly); Externa (property absorption)
Number Six	Female	Maren Elizabeth, Kelly, Veronica, Sheila	20 (1994)	Alive	Katarina (Kater)	Novis (invisibility); Sturma (ability to manipulate water, earth, wind and fire); Audis (accelerated hearing)
Number Seven	Female	Marina, Birgitta, Yasmin, Minka, Genevieve, Astrid, Sophie, Odette	19 (1994)	Alive	Adelina (Adel)	Submari (ability to breathe underwater); Noxen (ability to see in the dark); Recupero (ability to heal); Glacen (ability to manipulate ice)
Number Eight	Male	Joseph, Naveen, Vishnu	19-21 (1990-1992)	Deceased (stabbed in the heart by Five)	Reynolds	Morfen (ability to shapeshift); Teleportation; Pondus (ability to walk on water); Precognition
Number Nine	Male	Stanley Worthington, Professor Nine, Tony	18 (1995)	Alive	Sandor	Anima (ability to communicate with animals); Fortem (super strength); Accelix (super speed); Audis (super hearing); Miras (ability to share powers); Liberium (Anti-gravity abilities)
Number Ten	Female	Ella, Mousey	13-14 (1999)	Alive	Crayton (unofficial)	Dreynen (ability to temporarily cancel another's legacies); Precognition; Aeternus (ability to change age); Telepathy

=== Other Loric ===
- Henri (Brandon), John's Cêpan.
- Hilde (Hessu), One's Cêpan.
- Conrad, Maggie's Cêpan.
- Kentra, Hannu's Cêpan.
- Rey (Albert), Five's Cêpan
- Katarina (Kater), Six's Cêpan.
- Adelina (Adel), Marina's Cêpan.
- Reynolds, Eight's Cêpan.
- Sandor, Nine's Cêpan.
- Crayton, Ella's Cêpan.
- Lexa (GUARD), a Loric hacker hiding on Earth.
- Pittacus Lore, leader of the nine Elders of Lorien who sent the Garde to Earth.
- The Chimaera who traveled with the Garde to Earth: Bernie Kosar (a beagle, John), Olivia (a Loric creature, Ella), Dust (a wolf, Adam), Stanley (a cat, Sam), Biscuit (a golden retriever, Daniela), Gamera (a snapping turtle, Ran), Regal (a hawk, Caleb), Bandit (a raccoon, Nigel).

=== Humans ===
- Sarah Hart, John's girlfriend in Ohio
- Mark James, Sarah's ex-boyfriend and John's rival.
- Sam Goode, John's friend and Loric ally.
- Malcolm Goode, Sam's father and longtime Loric ally.
- Agent Karen Walker, an FBI agent pursuing the Garde.
- Agent Murray, a Loric sympathizer recruited by Walker.
- Agent Purdy, a MogPro FBI agent receiving genetic enhancements.
- Secretary Bud Sanderson, a politician allied with the Mogs.
- Daniela Morales, a human with a surprising ability.
- General Grahish Sharma, an ally of Number Eight in India.
- Héctor Ricardo, Marina's friend in Spain.
- General Clarence Lawson, leader of the human military resistance during the Mogadorian Invasion.

=== Mogadorians ===
- Setrákus Ra, the Mogadorian leader, originally a member of the Garde, and the series' primary antagonist.
- Adamus "Adam" Sutekh, a Mog who allies himself with the Garde and whose father allowed testing on him after he got the abilities of Number One.
- General Andrakkus Sutekh, a trueborn Mog leader and Adam's father.
- Phiri Dun-Ra, a disgraced trueborn Mog commander.
- Ivanick Shu-Ra, a trueborn Mog bent on hunting down the Garde.
- Dr. Lockam Anu, a researcher at Ashwood.
- Rexicus "Rex" Saturnus, a Mog who begins to doubt the leadership of Setrákus Ra.

== Critical reception ==
Reception to the series has been mostly positive. The first two books, I Am Number Four and The Power of Six, both reached #1 on The New York Times Best Seller list, collectively spending ten weeks in the top spot.

== Adaptations ==
In 2009 DreamWorks Pictures bought the rights to I Am Number Four and released the movie on February 18, 2011. The movie was the first DreamWorks film to be distributed by Disney's Touchstone Pictures and received generally negative reviews from critics, with review aggregator Rotten Tomatoes giving a score of 32% based on 156 reviews. The movie had a worldwide gross of $145,982,798 and a budget of $50 million, but still fell short of expectations.

Plans for any future installments for the series were eventually shelved. Director D. J. Caruso confirmed that he would like to direct a sequel, but in an interview with MTV Hollywood Crush Lore has stated that any questions or requests for a sequel should be directed to producer Michael Bay.

In April 2024, series author James Frey confirmed in an interview with Sci-Fi & Fantasy Gazette that Neal H. Moritz was producing a new adaptation of the series, with writers Alfred Gough and Miles Millar returning from the 2011 film, although he noted that he was unsure if the project would be made or not.
