= I Am Number Four =

2010 novel by James Frey

- The American cover of I Am Number Four
- Author: Pittacus Lore (James Frey & Jobie Hughes)
- Language: English
- Series: Lorien Legacies
- Genre: Young adult Science fiction
- Publisher: HarperCollins
- Publication date: August 3, 2010
- Publication place: United States
- Pages: 440
- ISBN: 0-06-196955-9
- Followed by: The Power of Six

I Am Number Four is a young adult science fiction novel by Pittacus Lore (the pseudonym of James Frey and Jobie Hughes) and the first book in the Lorien Legacies series. The book was published by HarperCollins on August 3, 2010, and spent seven successive weeks at #1 on the children's chapter of the New York Times bestseller list.

DreamWorks Pictures bought the rights to the film in June 2009; it was released on February 18, 2011, and was the first DreamWorks movie to be distributed by Disney's Touchstone Pictures.

== Plot ==
The first book of the "Lorian Legacies Series", "I am Number Four" centers on the conflict between two extraterrestrial species: the Loric and the Mogadorians. The Loric are classified into two factions: the overseers known as the Cepân and the guardians known as the Garde, the latter of whom possess unique abilities known as Legacies. The story begins with a prelude that follows Hannu – the alias used by Number Three, one of nine Garde children who fled to Earth after their homeworld of Lorien was invaded. While residing in Kenya, he is discovered and killed by Mogadorian assassins under the command of General Andrakkus Sutekh.

Most of the book is told in the first person by Number Four, who begins as Daniel Jones. As the story opens, he and his guardian, or Cepân, Henri, learn of the death of Number Three and move to Paradise, Ohio, assuming a new identity as John Smith. There, John befriends conspiracy theorist Sam Goode and "adopts" a dog identified by its name tag as "Bernie Kosar". He also meets and develops feelings for a fellow student, Sarah Hart, who is working as a photographer. Sarah's ex-boyfriend, football player Mark James, bullies and torments both John and Sam.

During a Halloween parade, Henri and Sam have a competition about naming Sci-fi theories. Sam mentions that he knows about Mogadorians from a magazine, They Walk Among Us, a revelation that alarms both John and Henri. Later, Mark and his friends organize a nasty surprise during the haunted hayride: Sarah, John, and Sam are left stranded in the woods, where Mark plans to beat up John. John uses his "legacies", which are akin to superpowers, to fend off his attackers and rescue Sarah. Sarah does not see John use his legacies in the darkness, so John emphatically warns Mark not to talk (or let his friends talk) about what happened; otherwise, he will punish Mark severely.

As the book progresses, Sarah and John's relationship develops. Henri trains John to use his legacies, now with growing urgency. Henri becomes unsettled and tells John that it is not safe to stay in Paradise. He is also concerned, as John is late in developing his telekinesis, a power that he will need to fight the Mogadorians. Later, it is revealed that Sam has seen enough to arouse his suspicions, but John allays them by bluffingly 'admitting' to being an alien. He finds out more about the magazine Sam reads by borrowing a copy. Sam speaks of his belief that his father has been abducted by aliens.

Henri discovers where the magazine is printed and drives the two-hour car trip to Athens, Ohio, to find out more. John attends a Thanksgiving dinner with Sarah's family but worries about Henri, who does not answer his text messages. In his agitated state, John's telekinetic power manifests, though uncontrolled, and he leaves. He calls Sam for help, and they take Sam's father's long-unused truck and head to Athens, where they rescue Henri, who has been taken captive. During the rescue, Sam becomes fully aware of John's and Henri's alien secret, and John's legacies develop significantly. On their return, Henri insists they leave Paradise. John refuses, using his newfound powers to express his adamance, and Henri relents.

A few months pass during which John trains in using his legacies. Henri gradually relaxes as John becomes more adept. At a party at Mark's house, a major fire breaks out, trapping Sarah and forcing John to use his powers to save her. He then reveals his secret to Sarah, and they lie to the police and a reporter about what happened. Later on, John also lies to Henri to avoid revealing how much he has told Sarah.

But John's lies are revealed when a video is released on YouTube. Henri is furious and demands they leave immediately. John again uses his powers to stop him and desperately races to the school, knowing that Sarah is in danger. He finds Sarah, but the Mogadorians have already arrived. The Mogadorians have brought an enormous beast called Piken and smaller, but still deadly, creatures called Krauls. These creatures are sent to track and kill the Loric. John and Sarah are joined by Number Six (who has been looking for them since Three's death) and later by Henri, Mark, and Bernie Kosar ("the dog"). John sends Mark off, exhorting him to protect Sarah. A furious battle ensues, during which Six exhibits powers of invisibility and weather control, and Bernie Kosar is revealed to be a Chimæra, an animal on Lorien that can shapeshift. Sam arrives partway through the battle.

John kills a soldier, Bernie Kosar battles a Piken, and at key moments John is helped by his Six, Sam and Mark, but in the end they are outnumbered and outpowered. Six is wounded and taken to relative safety by Sam. John uses an ability he was barely aware of to communicate with a beast brought by the Mogadorians and to turn it against them. Henri is killed, but before dying exhorts John to read a letter he left for him. John survives when Sarah kills the final scout with a knife, and the Mogadorians are defeated, but John passes out.

John wakes to find himself in a motel, along with his friends and Bernie Kosar. Promising to return for Sarah, John leaves Paradise, along with Number Six, Sam, and Bernie Kosar.

== Characters ==
- Number 4 (John Smith): John Smith is the protagonist of the story. Each Loric can only be killed in order of their number. Number 1,2 and 3 have already been killed and John is next in line to be killed by the Mogadorians.
- Sarah Hart: John's girlfriend, whom John develops extremely strong feelings for, and refuses to move to be with her and thus sacrifices himself and his race to be with her.
- Mark James: The ex-boyfriend of Sarah Hart and main antagonist and bully of John Smith and Sam Goode for the first part of the novel.
- Henri (Brandon): John's Cepân, teacher, from Lorien, sent to help John learn to control his developing legacies and to protect him.
- Sam Goode: John's best friend. Sam's father went missing and is not "found" until later in the series. Sam is a sci-fi/alien geek.
- Mogadorians: A race of aliens responsible for killing the Loric and now hunting the 9.
- The 9: 9 Garde children sent away from Lorien at the time of the invasion in order to someday restore their planet, they each develop powers(legacies), and cannot be killed out of order as they are protected by an ancient and powerful spell.
- Bernie Kosar: A Chimæra (magical pet that can change between animals), who protects John. His preferred form is a Beagle. John is unaware of his Lorian past until very late in the book.
- Number 6: The only other Loric to appear in the first novel of the series. Number 6 risks breaking the Lorian spell that protects each Loric so they can only be killed in order to meet John. She only appears at the very end of the "I am Number Four" novel.

== Reception ==
I Am Number Four has received mixed reviews. Kirkus Reviews wrote, "If it were a Golden Age comic, this tale of ridiculous science, space dogs and humanoid aliens with flashlights in their hands might not be bad." The Chicago Tribune said, "There's genuine suspense…it's easy to get lost in the world of the sweet teen from another planet." Booklist reviewed it as, "Terrifically propulsive." Publishers Weekly wrote, "For those looking for an undemanding, popcorn-ready read, this 'guy—okay, alien—gets the girl and saves the world' adventure should do the trick." School Library Journal wrote, "With its interesting premises and a fast-pace telling, the story will grab readers who are willing to suspend quite a bit of disbelief. Others, who like their science fiction with a bit more science and internal logic, will have to search elsewhere." The Horn Book reviewed it as, "Riveting." It was on the number one spot of the New York Times Best Seller list for 7 weeks and was on it for a total of 17 weeks.
