= The Power of Six =

2011 novel by James Frey

- British cover
- Author: Pittacus Lore (James Frey and Jobie Hughes)
- Language: English
- Series: Lorien Legacies
- Genre: Young adult Science fiction
- Publisher: HarperCollins
- Publication date: August 23, 2011
- Publication place: United States
- Media type: Print (Hardcover)
- Pages: 406
- ISBN: 0-06-197455-2
- OCLC: 750383507
- Preceded by: I Am Number Four
- Followed by: The Rise of Nine

The Power of Six is the second book in the young adult science fiction series Lorien Legacies, written by Pittacus Lore (James Frey and Jobie Hughes). It is the sequel to I Am Number Four, and was released August 23, 2011 by HarperCollins Publishers.

== Plot ==
The book is told by various members of the Garde: Number Four/John, who is on the run with Sam, Six, and Bernie Kosar (aka Hadley, a Lorien Chimæra); and Number Seven/Marina, who is hiding at a convent in Spain.

Marina is Number Seven and her Cêpan has chosen to stay in Santa Teresa, where they have lived in the town orphanage for over 7 years. Adelina, Marina's Cêpan, has stopped believing that it is possible for them to defeat the Mogadorians and so refuses to help Marina learn about her developing 'Legacies', saying to instead concentrate on "not dying". While exploring the web searching for news of the other Garde, Marina finds the story of John Smith, and quickly realises he must be one of the Garde.

In the meantime, John, Sam and Six are on the run in the US from both the FBI and the Mogadorians. They settle for a week in a secluded location, but are soon ambushed by a squad of Mogs. They get away and John finally builds up the courage to open the letter left to him by Henri (his Cêpan who died at the end of the previous book). In the letter it is revealed that Sam's dad, Malcolm Goode, was aware of the Lorien Mission and had been there to help Henri and John settle down on Earth when they first arrived.

The group decide to head back to Paradise, Ohio. When they arrive, they head to Sam's backyard where he is convinced his dad had hidden a communication device. During the search they are again attacked by Mogs; this time they steal John's Loric chest and the team splits up to hunt the Mogs down. After the chase, John is led to the vicinity of Sarah's house and he decides he must see her, so he messages her that he is there. After their reunion, John and Sam are ambushed by the FBI and this leads to John believing that it was Sarah who turned him in.

Meanwhile, Marina befriends Ella (a new girl at the orphanage) who is later revealed to be Number Ten, another member of the Garde who arrived on the second ship from Lorien.

John and Sam are taken to FBI HQ but are quickly rescued by the raging-mad Six, who complains about John going to meet with his girlfriend instead of helping her battle the Mogs. She reveals that she is headed to Santa Teresa, Spain, as she has found a help signal. John refuses, saying he isn't leaving without his chest.

The team splits up again. Six travels to Spain where she rescues Marina and Ella from the attacking Mogs, and John and Sam go to the Mogadorian base to attempt to retrieve the stolen chests. In the process they are almost caught, and during their escape they find and rescue Number Nine. Four and Nine manage to escape, but Sam does not.

== Characters ==
- John Smith - The narrator of the first book. He also narrates half of this book. He is the fourth member of the Loric Garde.
- Number Six - Sixth member of the Loric Garde who accompanies John throughout this book and evolves to become his other romantic interest.
- Sam Goode - John's best friend and Number Six's other love interest. He also joins John and Six throughout their journey.
- Marina - The narrator of half the book. She is the seventh member of the Loric Garde. She finally meets Number Six at the end of the book.
- Adelina - Marina's Cêpan. She dies during the battle in the convent with the Mogadorians to save Marina. When in the convent, she doesn't believe Lorien is still alive
- Ella - Marina's best friend. She is the tenth member of the Loric Garde who has the ability to change between ages, known as an Aeternus.
- Crayton - Ella's unofficial Cêpan (she was too young to be assigned a Cêpan when she left Lorien in another ship as a baby).
- Héctor Ricardo - Marina's only human friend.
- Number Nine - The ninth member of the Loric Garde in the series. He is initially a prisoner of the Mogadorians in a Mogadorians’ base in West Virginia.
- Sarah Hart - John's girlfriend from Paradise, Ohio. She was suspected to have called the FBI.

== Reception ==
Reception for The Power of Six has been mixed to positive, with the School Library Journal writing that although the book has "a lack of character development, pedestrian dialogue, and uneven continuity... the nonstop action and violence-packed fight sequences will keep fans of the first novel happy". Kirkus Reviews gave a similar review, criticizing the character development.

=== Booktracks ===
In 2011 it was announced that The Power of Six would be adapted by New York tech startup Booktrack to produce an enhanced e-book version of the novel. Enhancements to the novel would include sound effects, synchronized music, and automated scrolling through the book.
