= Stuart Wagman =

American chess player (1919–2007)

Personal information
- Born: May 14, 1919 New York City, U.S.
- Died: November 24, 2007 (aged 88) Livorno, Italy

Chess career
- Country: United States
- Title: FIDE Master (1986)
- Peak rating: 2330 (July 1971)

Stuart Wagman (May 14, 1919, in New York City, New York – November 24, 2007, in Livorno, Italy) was an American chess player and FIDE Master.

Though a citizen of the United States, he spent much of his life in Italy. Wagman first came to wide attention through an article by Grandmaster Andy Soltis, printed in his column "Chess to Enjoy" in Chess Life (and later anthologized in Soltis's book Karl Marx Plays Chess), describing Wagman's accomplishments as a "late bloomer" who made his international debut at the age of 46. Soltis named Wagman as an expert in the Sicilian Dragon.

Wagman attained the FIDE Master title in his sixties, and maintained a high level of play well into his eighties. Wagman played in the 2006 World Senior Championship at the age of 87, making him the second-oldest participant at the event; his score of 6/11 put him in a three-way tie (with Bill Hook and Eduard Zelkind) for the best performance among United States players.
