= The Rise of Nine =

2012 novel by James Frey

- Author: Pittacus Lore
- Language: English
- Series: Lorien Legacies
- Genre: Young adult
- Publisher: HarperCollins (US); Penguin (UK)
- Publication date: August 21, 2012
- Publication place: United States
- Media type: Hardcover
- Pages: 360
- ISBN: 978-0-06-197458-8
- Preceded by: The Power of Six
- Followed by: The Fall of Five

The Rise of Nine is a young adult teen fiction novel by Pittacus Lore and the third novel in the Lorien Legacies. It is published by HarperCollins, & was released on August 21, 2012, in the US and by Penguin on August 30, 2012 in the UK. It is the first book in the series to be written after Jobie Hughes left the project.

The Fall of Five continues the Lorien series.

== Characters ==
- Number Four: One of the Garde who is the unofficial leader of the team. He goes by the name John Smith.
- Number Six: A female Garde who is a candidate for the strongest of them in terms of raw power.
- Number Seven: A female Garde from Spain who goes by the name Marina. She is vegetarian and the cook of the group.
- Number 10: An 11 year old girl who was brought to earth by her father, and not with the rest of the Garde. She goes by the name Ella.
- Number Nine: A recently escaped prisoner who is hotheaded and cocky, and is debatably the strongest of them. He is the best fighter and never runs from a fight.
- Crayton: Ella’s Cêpan
- Number Eight: A free spirited and fun boy who spent his life hiding in India masquerading as the Hindu deity Vishnu.
- Sarah: Number Four’s girlfriend who they find imprisoned at the Dulce Base. She is kind and supportive, and serves as the heart and soul of the team.
- Sam: Number Four’s best friend from Paradise. He is a firm believer in aliens and government conspiracies.
- Setrákus Ra: The Mogadorian Leader bent on the colonization of Earth and enslaving its inhabitants.

== Plot ==
Marina and Six, along with Ella (previously unknown member of the Garde) and Crayton (her Cêpan) are on a plane heading towards India, where they hope to find another member of the Garde: Number Eight. As soon as they land at the New Delhi airport they are picked up by men who worship Eight as they believe him to be the reincarnation of the Hindu god Vishnu (it is later revealed that he appeared to them in the form of Vishnu, thanks to his shape-shifting abilities). They plan to take the four to the summit of a mountain in the Himalayas, which is where Eight has made his home. However, before they reach him, they were ambushed by soldiers of the Lord's Resistance Front, an organization of people who want to kill Eight and all of those associated with him. After defeating their attackers and reaching the mountain, Six, Seven and Ten have to face three of Vishnu's avatars, which are used as a way of testing whether they are really members of the Garde.

Once Number Eight realizes that they are Loric, he tells them his story; his Cêpan Reynolds was killed by Mogadorians after being betrayed by the love of his life, a human named Lola. During this same attack, Eight's chest was taken by the Mogadorians (Marina finds it afterwards). Eight has been living in the Himalayas since. They discover that one of Eight's legacies is the ability to teleport, which they plan to use to reach New Mexico, where they can easily make their way to Number Four.

They travel further up the mountain to a Loric cave that contains a large stone of Loralite, and acts as a "door" between several other locations that have a Loralite stone. In the cave they see paintings on the walls that are a timeline of the events that have happened. (They see One's, Two's, and Three's deaths, Four's battle in the school and Number Five battling Mogs from a tree). They then come across a painting of a Loric with a sword through them, although the face is ripped off. It is revealed this is Number Eight, who ripped off the face to try to avoid his fate. The Mogs then burst into the cave and kill Crayton, forcing the group to perform a hurried teleportation together from the Himalayas. Six is teleported to a desert in New Mexico while Eight, Seven, and Ten end up in Somalia. Six is dehydrated due to desert heat but manages to make it to an abandoned town, where she is captured by FBI agents. After intense questioning she manages to break out and in the process comes across Sarah Hart, Four's girlfriend who supposedly turned him in to the FBI in the previous novel. To Six's horror, the false Sarah Hart forms into Setrákus Ra. She challenges Setrákus Ra to a one-on-one fight before being thrown into a cell with the real Sarah Hart.

Meanwhile, Four and Nine, along with Bernie Kosar, Four's shape-shifting Chimæra, are captured by the FBI, who are now working with the Mogs. Whilst in transit they escape easily, seriously wounding their captors in the process. Four asks one of the dying agents, Agent Walker, where Sam and Sarah are being held and is told that they are being held out west. Walker then seemingly dies. Once he helps Nine fight off the rest of the FBI, Four returns to the van they had been traveling in only to find that all the bodies are gone.

The pair take a freight train to Chicago and argue about what to do next. They eventually decide to go to Nine's safe house, although Four is angered by how little Nine seems to care about Sam and Sarah. Nine reveals that his safe house is in the top floor of the John Hancock Center, including training rooms, weapon cabinets and citywide surveillance systems. Nine shows off how experienced he is with all the rooms and, when the talk returns to Sam and the tablet the two found, that he has a piece of equipment that fits the tablet. When they use it they see a map of the Earth with several pulsing blue dots; two in Chicago, one in Jamaica and four in India. They realize that the tablet shows the locations of the other Garde and, seeing that there are seven dots instead of six, realized that there was a second ship that made it to Earth, carrying with it a tenth Garde member. They then see two green dots, one in New Mexico and the other in Egypt, and realize that these are their ships. As they watch, the four dots in India suddenly reappear, with three off the coast of Somalia and one in New Mexico.

The pair once again disagree about what to do next (with Four wanting to go to New Mexico to rescue the stranded Garde member and Nine wanting to go to Sam's house in Paradise, Ohio, to see what else they can find) and it becomes violent. The fight goes to the roof where, after a long battle, Nine holds Four over the edge and demands that he stop claiming to be Pittacus Lore (which he had told Nine during one of their arguments) and that they go to Paradise. Nine lets Four back onto the roof and storms off, threatening to drop him next time. Later in the night, Four has a vision where he and Nine are told to go to New Mexico. After finding out that Nine had the same vision they travel together towards New Mexico. Four begins to grow fond of Nine when he witnesses him defending a pair of unarmed hitchhikers from their assailants and they begin to open up about their previous lives.

In the meantime Seven, Eight, and Ten are able to teleport to Stonehenge and then on to New Mexico, after Ella contacts Six through telepathy (developing her first legacy) and learns her location. She even contacts Number Four. They eventually reunite after defeating the FBI who were attacking Four and Nine and enter the base where Setrákus Ra and Number Six are fighting. Setrákus Ra manages to use his power of removing a Garde member's legacy and overpowers Six but, instead of killing her, he uses a whip-like weapon to turn her into black rock. The group fight their way through the base and finds Sarah, who believes that Four is Setrákus Ra trying to trick her. Once Four convinces her that it really is him they move on, also finding a badly injured Agent Walker. They tell Sarah to watch her, giving her a Mogadorian cannon to shoot Walker with if she tries to escape.

In a large room they see a black statue on the roof, which Nine goes to inspect and finds Six there, telling them that Setrákus Ra is dead and that the black mass is Mogadorian poison. Eight teleports to Six and embraces her, but is stabbed just as the painting in the Loric cave showed. The fake Six then transforms into Setrákus Ra, who removes all of their legacies. Nine fights Setrákus Ra whilst Bernie Kosar fights off the Mogadorian soldiers. Four and Marina try to carry away Eight so that Marina's healing legacy can return and save him, but are also attacked by Mogs. After defeating them they carry on trying to pull Eight out of the battle. John, protecting Marina and Eight, gets hurt and is losing blood very quickly. Ella, out of nowhere comes and throws a red object at Ra, allowing the Gardes to gain back their powers. This allows Marina to heal everyone and save Eight's life. Six's body returns to normal. Just when the Gardes reunite, Setrákus Ra and all the Mogadorians in the room are gone.

== Development ==
The Rise of Nine suffered brief setbacks after the departure of Hughes from the project, stating differences of opinion for the direction of the series. In August 2012, ghostwriter Greg Boose issued a tweet that contained a photograph of a hardcover copy of The Rise of Nine, hinting that he was the ghostwriter of the series.

In an interview with Entertainment Weekly it was confirmed that there would be at least six books in the series, with the series continuing "until the war ends".

== Reception ==
Reception for The Rise of Nine was positive, with the book garnering praise from Teenreads and Digital Journal.
