= Nicholas E. Wagman =

American astronomer (1905–1980)

Nicholas E. Wagman (1905–1980) was an American astronomer and astrometrist.

Beginning in 1930, Wagman was associated with Pittsburgh's Allegheny Observatory. He was director of the Observatory and also chairman of the University of Pittsburgh's Astronomy Department from 1941 until 1970. Under his direction, the 0.76-m Thaw refractor was renovated and used to set the standard for parallax determinations, of which over 1200 were made. Many binary stars were also discovered and characterized.

The Nicholas E. Wagman Observatory of the Amateur Astronomers Association of Pittsburgh is named after him, as is the asteroid 3110 Wagman.
