= Deer Lakes Park =

County park in Allegheny County, Pennsylvania

- Location within Pennsylvania Location within the United States
- Type: Municipal
- Coordinates: 40.620728°N 79.81945°W
- Area: 1,180-acre (4.8 km^{2})

Deer Lakes Park is a 1,180-acre (4.8 km^{2}) county park in Allegheny County, Pennsylvania in the United States. It is a part of the county's 12,000-acre (49 km^{2}) network of nine distinct parks.

The park is sited 15 miles northeast of downtown Pittsburgh in Frazer and West Deer townships. Deer Lakes already had a large man-made lake, and during its development two other lakes were added. The lakes are spring fed, and construction of dams and settling basins create a park ideal for fishing. An 18-hole disc golf course with skill-respective tees is featured in the park, and is one of the highest-rated courses in the United States.

Allegheny County is currently evaluating proposals to lease natural gas rights for high volume hydraulic fracturing. This would be the first Allegheny County park to be leased for that practice. County residents have expressed worry concerning the potential dangers of leasing a public park for an industrial purpose, citing an increase in truck traffic, air pollution, water pollution, decreased property value, and potential for catastrophic events, (e.g., an explosion), as possible hazards.
